= Ignatius Maloyan =

Armenian Catholic archbishop and martyr (1869–1915)

Saint Ignatius Maloyan ICPB
- Archbishop of Mardin
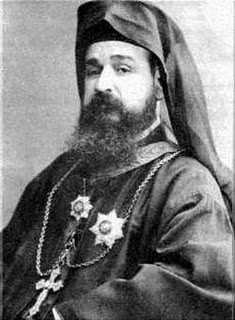
- Saint Ignatius, c. 1911
- Church: Armenian Catholic Church
- Diocese: Archdiocese of Mardin
- Appointed: October 22, 1911
- Term ended: June 11, 1915

Orders
- Ordination: 12 Jul 1896
- Consecration: 22 Oct 1911

Personal details
- Born: 8 April 1869 Mardin, Mardin Sanjak, Diyarbekir vilayet, Ottoman Empire
- Died: 11 June 1915 (aged 46) Sheikhan Caves, Mardin Sanjak, Diyarbekir vilayet, Ottoman Empire

Sainthood
- Feast day: 11 June
- Venerated in: Catholic Church
- Beatified: 7 October 2001; Saint Peter's Basilica, Vatican City by Pope John Paul II
- Canonized: 19 October 2025; Saint Peter's Square, Vatican City by Pope Leo XIV

Ignatius Maloyan (Armenian: Իգնատիոս Մալոյան, April 8, 1869 – June 11, 1915), born as Shukrallah Maloyan, was an prelate of the Armenian Catholic Church who served as Archbishop of Mardin from 1911 to 1915. After repeatedly refusing conversion to Islam, he was tortured and murdered by the Ottoman Gendarmerie during the Armenian genocide, specifically in Diyarbekir Vilayet under Mehmed Reshid. Maloyan was beatified by Pope John Paul II as a martyr in 2001. In 2025, Pope Francis approved a plan for his canonization. He was canonized on October 19, 2025.

== Early life ==
Shoukrallah Maloyan was born in 1869 in an Armenian family. When he was fourteen years old, he was sent by his parish priest to the Armenian Catholic Cathedral at Bzoummar, Lebanon. He completed his theological studies on 2 August 1896 and adopted the religious name Ignatius in honor of Ignatius of Antioch. During the years 1897–1910, Maloyan served the Armenian Catholic Eparchy of Alexandria as a parish priest in Alexandria and Cairo. Maloyan began serving in Constantinople as an assistant to the Armenian Catholic Patriarch, Paul Petros XII Sabbaghian in 1904. According to historian Charles A. Frazee, the Patriarch chose to continue the policies of his predecessor and did not protest against Turkish and Kurdish massacres of his faithful, but instead focused upon giving humanitarian relief to the survivors.

After the Young Turk Revolution in 1908, however, the Patriarch came under attack by some Catholic Armenians, who considered him, "an unworthy prelate". Having little desire for conflict, Patriarch Paul Petros submitted his resignation to Pope Pius X in August 1910.

The National Council of the Armenian Catholic Church accordingly met and, on April 23, 1911, unanimously selected the Bishop of Adana as Paul Petros XIII Terzian. During a visit to the Vatican in order to receive the Pallium, the Patriarch was told that the Pope would choose the bishops for the vacant Sees out of a list of names chosen by the Patriarch and approved by the Congregation for the Propagation of the Faith. Pope Pius X also summoned the Armenian Catholic bishops to Rome, "to confer on the difficulties facing their Church."

Despite the best efforts of Armenian Catholic dissenters and of the Ottoman State, Patriarch Paul Petros XIII accordingly convened the Synod in Rome with 13 bishops present on October 15, 1911. Following a Synod whose decrees greatly strengthened the independence and governing role the Armenian Catholic clergy at the expense of the Ottoman Government and the laity, Fr. Maloyan was consecrated in Rome as Archbishop of Mardin on October 22, 1911.

In a 20th-century renewal of the Investiture Controversy, both the National Council and Sultan Mehmet V declared, in retaliation for having convened a Synod outside of the Ottoman Empire and for consecrating Bishops without asking first for the Government's approval, that Patriarch Paul Petros XIII was deposed. A Patriarchal locum tenens, Bishop Hatchadourian of Malatia, was appointed instead and moved into the Patriarch's official residence in Istanbul. Although Pope Pius X immediately declared the new "Patriarch" suspended, the Vatican was unable to restore Patriarch Paul Petros XIII as long as the Ottoman Government supported his rival.

For this reason, Archbishop Maloyan arrived in his Archdiocese, immediately after the 1913 Ottoman coup d'état transformed the Empire into a de facto single party state governed by the Three Pashas as the thinking heads of the Committee of Union and Progress political party, to find the Armenian Catholics of Mardin in turmoil. He tried to restore order, while also encouraging devotion to the Sacred Heart.

According to Charles E. Frazee, "Thus the Armenian Catholic Church, with about 140,000 members, entered the period of the First World War with a deep division in its ranks. Each Patriarch had his own partisans among the clergy and laity, and compromise seemed far away. Despite the fact that, of all Armenians, Catholics were the most loyal to the Ottoman Government, they were not to be spared the genocide that lay ahead."

== Prelude to genocide ==
=== The Great War ===
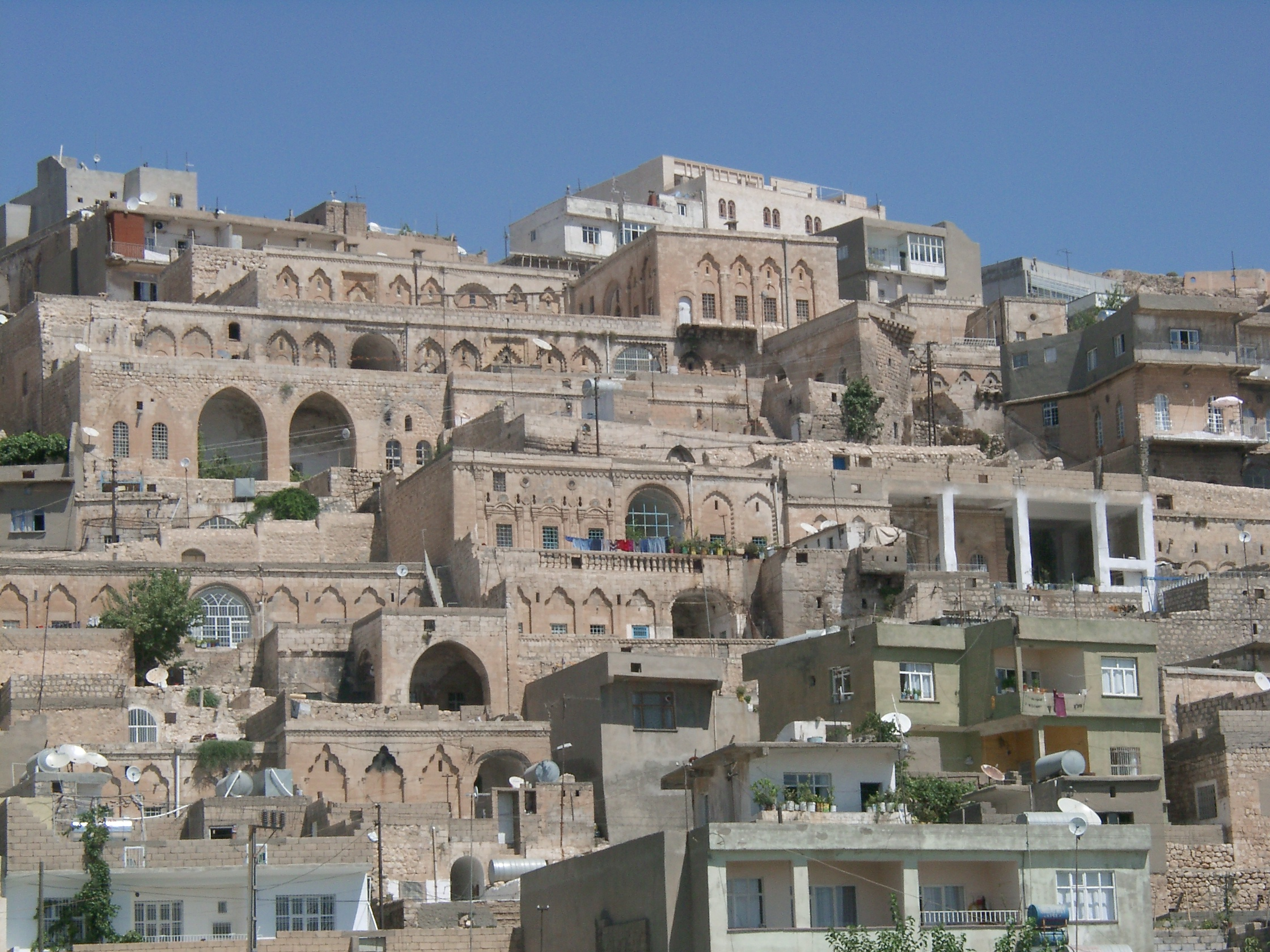
The old town of Mardin

According to Assyrian genocide scholar David Gaunt, so many detailed eyewitness accounts in multiple languages of the systematic slaughter of the region's Christians, without any distinction between sects or ethnicities, have survived that, "Mardin is the one place in the Ottoman Empire that provides us with a relatively complete day-by-day description of the persecution of the Armenians, Chaldeans, and Syriacs."

The conscription and mobilization of adult males, including Christians, began in Mardin in August 1914. House searches and public executions of both real and imagined deserters became a daily occurrence. The Ottoman Army also "requisitioned" both goods from Christian owned shops and draft animals for military use. The detailed Arabic language diary of Syriac Catholic priest Fr. Ishaq Armalé also records multiple cases of random violence and murders of Mardin's Christians.

On December 13, 1914, however, Hilmi Bey was appointed as mutasarrif of Mardin. Upon arrival, Hilmi Bey was polite and proper towards Archbishops Maloyan and Gabriel Tappouni and promised to, "help them with their problems." Soon after, when accusations spread that more Christian deserters were hiding in the area, both Archbishops met with the Mutasarrif, the police chief, and the head of the military garrison and requested a list of names so that might help with the search. This was interpreted by Hilmi Bey as a, "sign of upright love of the state."

On February 11, 1915, Archbishop Maloyan attended a dinner at Archbishop Tappouni's residence, which the Mutasarrif also attended.

Following the beginning of the Gallipoli campaign in March 1915, however, rumors reached Mardin of orders by the Three Pashas to implement pre-existing plans to exterminate the Empire's entire Christian population.

That same month, Dr. Mehmed Reshid was appointed as the new Vali of Diyarbekir and arrived with a small private death squad composed of Circassian volunteers.

On March 28, which was Palm Sunday, Turkish soldiers entered all of the churches for mass arrests of alleged deserters, including deacons, who previously been exempt from the draft. The military continued to harass both Armenian and Assyrian churchgoers all through Holy Week and Easter Sunday was spent with, "scared hearts and fearful restless minds."

Hoping to save lives, Archbishop Maloyan made every opportunity to express his Archdiocese's loyalty to the Ottoman Empire. For these statements, Maloyan was informed on April 6 that he was to receive a medal from Sultan Mehmed V.

On April 13, 1915, a militia unit was formed from local Muslim volunteers, which increased the worry of local Christians.

On April 20, 1915, the medal arrived and was publicly presented to Archbishop Maloyan along with a proclamation from the Sultan. In his acceptance speech, the Archbishop expressed hope for the continued health of Sultan Mehmet and the success of his Ministers and Generals in leading the Ottoman Empire to victory over the Allies.

On April 22, a senior Ottoman official tipped off local Armenian and Assyrian clergy, saying, "hide the letters, papers, and books that you have which contain political news or are written in French or Armenian. The government intends to search minutely for such material and to punish severely those who have such material in their possession."

=== Meeting ===
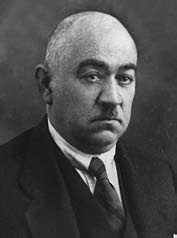
Aziz Feyzi Pirinççizade

Soon after the April 24th mass arrest of Armenian intellectuals in Istanbul, the Vali of Diyarbekir, Reşit Bey, sent his close associate Aziz Feyzi Pirinççizâde to convince the Turkish and Kurdish leaders of Mardin, who had refused to take part in the Hamidian massacres, to participate in what would later be dubbed the Armenian and Assyrian genocides. According to David Gaunt, Feyzi was the son of Arif Pirinççizâde, who had organized the Hamidian massacres in Diyarbekir Vilayet. Like his father, Feyzi was known to be, "a fanatic Pan-Turk nationalist."

According to Fr. Jacques Rhétoré, a French Dominican priest interned in Mardin, a large meeting was held in Mardin on May 15, 1915. Feyzi accused Hamid Bey, the previous Vali, of, "being soft on the Armenians and of being a close friend of the Armenian Bishop."

According to Fr. Ishaq Armalé, Feyzi declared, "Let no Christian remain! He who does not do this duty is no longer a Muslim."

Feyzi added, "The time has come to save Turkey from its national enemies, that is, the Christians. It is clear that the states of Europe will not punish us, because Germany is on our side and helps us."

Feyzi also mocked those who objected to murdering Christians, "You surprise me. What is holding you back? Is it the fear of one day having to pay for this? But what happened to those who killed Armenians in Abdul Hamid’s time? Today Germany is with us and our enemies are its enemies. This will surely give us victory in this war, and we won’t have to answer to anyone. Let us get rid of the Christians so we can be masters in our own house. This is what the government wants."

Everyone present at the meeting was required to sign a petition that Mardin's Christians were traitors and needed to be eliminated.

=== Preparing for martyrdom ===
On May 25, 1915, Reshid Bey arrived in Mardin and verbally ordered Hilmi Bey, the Mutasarrif, to arrest the Christian leaders of Mardin. Hilmi Bey responded, "I see no reason for Mardin's Christians to be arrested. Therefore I cannot comply with your demand." Hilmi then added, "I am not without conscience and cannot cooperate in the massacre of Ottoman subjects who are innocent and loyal to the government." Reshid Bey left the meeting determined to have Hilmi Bey replaced.

On June 1, 1915, Archbishop Maloyan met with Mar Gabriel Tappouni the Syriac Catholic Archbishop of Mardin. Maloyan read aloud the letter he had written to prepare his clergy and faithful for martyrdom, then folded it, and gave it to Tappouni, with the words, "Keep this testament on you." Although Tappouni then tried to console him, Maloyan replied, "I know for sure that I and my congregation will be condemned to torture and death. I expect them to come and arrest us any day. It is unavoidable... Pray for me. I suspect that this will be the last time I will see you."

The Archbishop's letter read, "I urge you first of all to strengthen your faith and trust in the Holy Church which goes back to the teaching received from St Peter whom Jesus Christ chose to be the rock on which He built His Holy Church and made from the Apostles' and Martyrs blood it's [sic] foundation; from where could we be granted this great gift where our blood, we sinners, become worthy to be mixed with the blood of those Holy Saints... My dear children I entrust you in God and ask you to pray for me so that He may grant me the strength and courage, till the shedding of my blood, so I would spend this perishable time in His grace and love."

=== Arrest and trial ===
On June 3, Hilmi Bey was lured away from Mardin and a delegation of officials arrived from Diyarbekir with long lists of Christian leaders to arrest under orders from the Vali.

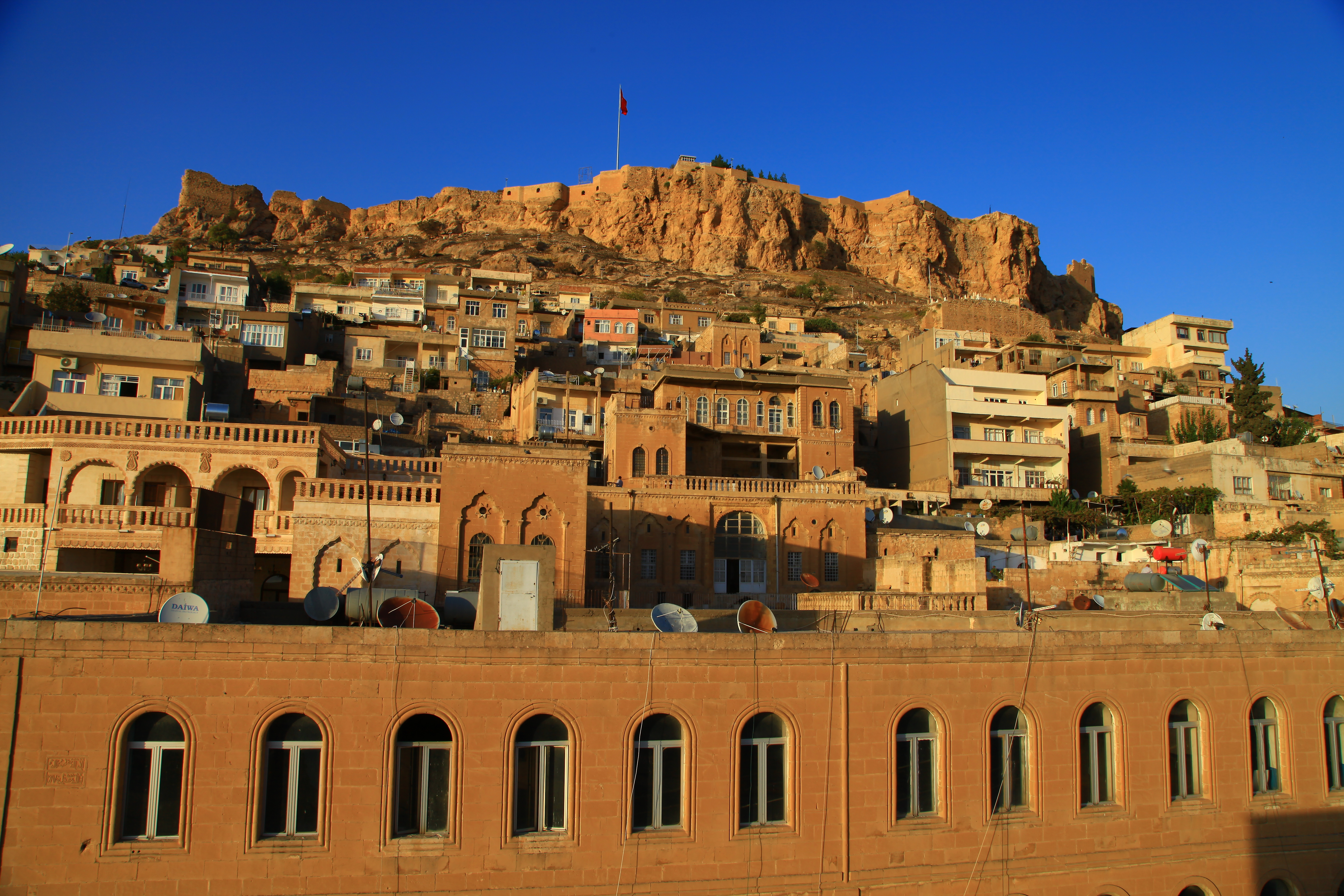
Mardin Castle

Between 3 and 4 June 1915, Archbishop Maloyan and 420 of the other leading Christians of Mardin were arrested and imprisoned in Mardin Castle.

When he was brought to trial, Maloyan stood accused of forming and leading a terrorist organization of Armenian nationalists and of hiding two boxes of guns and ammunition inside his cathedral. Although the Archbishop easily refuted these accusations, he was told by the Qadi, "Become Muslim and declare it or death will be your fate."

To the outrage of those present, the Archbishop replied, "Muslim? There is no way I would reject my religion and my Saviour. I have been brought up in the Holy Catholic Church, assimilated the base of its truthful teachings from a young age and became proficient in its undisputable facts until I unworthily become one of its pastors. I consider the shed of my blood for my faith to be the sweetest thing to my heart because I know for sure that if I get tortured for the love of the One who died for me I would become one of the happiest blessed people and I will see my Lord and my God in heaven. You can only beat me and cut me into pieces but I will never deny my religion."

One of those present was heard to cry, "Do you disdain our religion?!" Another slapped the Archbishop and shouted, "I swear to Allah to torture you and give you a violent death!"

Similarly outraged that the Archbishop had publicly refused conversion to Islam, Mardin's chief of the Ottoman Gendarmerie, Mahmdouh Bey, ordered that Maloyan would first be beaten and then severely tortured by bastinado and the extraction of his toenails. At every blow, the Archbishop was heard to cry, "Oh Lord, have mercy on me! Oh Lord, give me strength!"

On June 7, 1915, Hilmi Bey returned to Mardin and, "began energetic efforts to free the Christians, but he was quickly deposed and temporarily replaced by one of the conspirators, Khalil Adib, a judge of the criminal court and leader of the town's Committee of Union and Progress."

On June 9, 1915, Archbishop Maloyan and all the other prisoners were informed that the Vali, Reşit Bey, had summoned them and that they would be leaving for Diyarbekir the following day. At this point, Maloyan and all the other prisoners realized that they were going to die.

== Martyrdom ==
Under the direction of Mardin's chief of the Ottoman Gendarmerie, Mahmdouh Bey, Archbishop Maloyan, along with around 400 other Christians, was force-marched into the desert on the night of June 10, 1915.

At the front of the caravan marched Mahmdouh Bey. Many of the 400 prisoners had visible signs of having been tortured. Some had bleeding feet and fingers from nails that had been extracted, broken bones, and wounds upon their heads. Some had to be supported by other deportees to be able to walk at all. At the end of the procession walked Archbishop Maloyan, who was in shackles, barefoot, and walked with a limp after being repeatedly beaten on the soles of his feet.

According to Fr. Ishaq Armalé, “At the fall of darkness, Mardin residents could see soldiers going up to the fort and then returning to the prison. They carried iron rings, chains, and thick ropes. They called out the names of the prisoners one by one, and they tied them with ropes so that they could not flee… Then those who were thought to be Armenians were taken from the others. Rings were pressed around their necks and chains around their wrists. In this way they were bound, drawn, and chained for several hours… After having arranged the men in rows, they forced them out through the prison gates. Above them weapons and swords shined. The prisoners were kept totally silent. And a town crier cried out, ‘The Christian residents who leave their houses will be amputated and put together with their co-religionists.’ Then they trudged along the main street 417 priests and other men. Young and old, Armenians, Syriacs, Chaldeans, and Protestants. When they passed the Muslim quarter, the women came out and joked. They insulted the prisoners. Children threw stones. When the prisoners came to the Christian quarter, the residents could not go out to talk or say farewell. Many stood by the railings on their roofs and wept, praying to God. ... The Christians shuffled in silence like pupils on their way to school. They made no sound. ... When they came to the western city gate, those monks that were still free and the American missionaries went out on the roofs to see their friends for the last time and say farewell. They found them in a tragic state, so that blood could clot in their veins and terror hold them in its grip. There could not have been anything more difficult for the eye to see or more painful for the heart than standing there and looking down on the many chained co-religionists. Every time anyone cast a glance at that street, he would be reminded of the noble archbishop, the venerable priests, and the march of the dear Christians."

The column of deportees was escorted to a Kurdish village, Aderchek, near Cheikhan (Sheikhan), where 100 of their number were taken by Turkish troops to nearby caves, "a religious cult-place about six hours from Mardin."

At the Sheikhan Caves, Mahmdouh Bey read out what he said was an Imperial Firman charging all Christians with treason and sentencing them to death. Those prisoners who converted to Islam, however, would be set free and allowed to return to Mardin. Otherwise, they would be executed within the hour.

Archbishop Maloyan replied that he preferred to die as a Christian than live as a Muslim. The vast majority of the deportees agreed with the Archbishop and, the few who did not, were taken away by local Kurdish villagers and brought before their Shayk to undergo conversion to Islam.

One of the Turkish soldiers present at the scene later recalled, "We have never seen people so strong in their faith. If the Christians had captured us and offered us the same chance to convert, we all would have become Christians."

Archbishop Maloyan ordered his priests to circulate among the other prisoners to give them Absolution and Holy Communion. Then, he watched as his priests and faithful were massacred in front of him.

Archbishop Maloyan was again told by Mahmdouh Bey, as a religious duty during Jihad, that his life would be spared if he recited the Shahada and converted to Islam. The Archbishop replied, "It's strange that you ask me this again although I told you before that I would live and die loyal to my faith and can only boast about my Lord's noble Cross." This enraged Mahmdouh Bey, who drew his revolver and personally executed Maloyan with a pistol shot. The Archbishop's last words after being shot were reportedly, "My God, have mercy on me! Into Your hands I commend my spirit!"

The local Kurdish population stripped the clothes from the bodies of the victims, which remained untouched for five hours until they were all collected, doused with petrol, and burned.

== Perpetrators ==
=== Reşit Bey ===
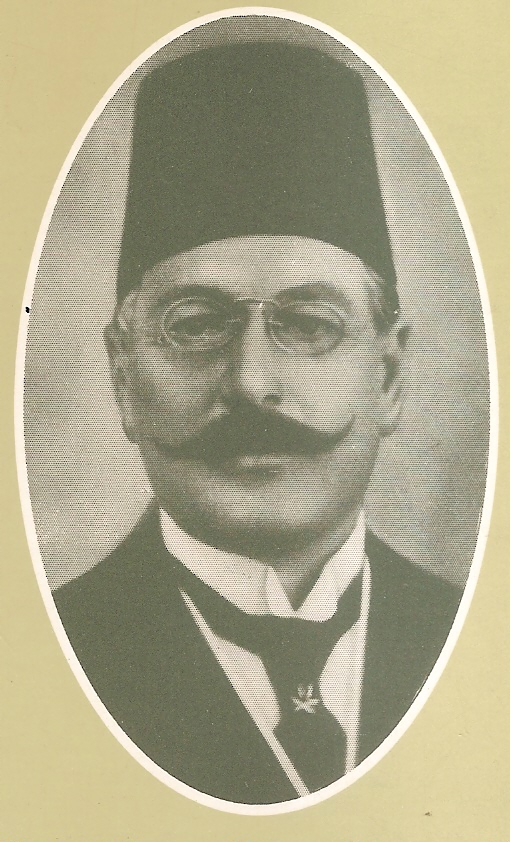
Dr. Mehmet Resit Bey.

Walter Holstein, the Imperial German Consul at Mosul, learned of the deportation and murder of Archbishop Maloyan and every other member of the caravan via a letter which no longer survives, but which was written either by Hilmi Bey or Shefik Bey. Holstein immediately informed the German Ambassador in Constantinople, Hans von Wangenheim, who in turn informed Berlin. The German Foreign Office then issued a formal protest through Ambassador von Wangenheim to the Ottoman Minister of the Interior, Talat Pasha. Through Ambassador von Wangenheim, the Imperial German Government demanded that Reşit Bey be removed as Vali of Diyarbekir, "lest his murderous policies lead to the total extermination of the Christians in his area." Instead, Talat Pasha chose to send an ambiguously worded reprimand ordering an end to the killing of non-Armenian Christians to Reşit Bey, who ignored it, remained at his post until March 1916, and was never otherwise reprimanded for his role in the Armenian and Assyrian genocides.

Even though he is now known as the "Butcher of Diyarbakir", Reşit Bey claimed, during a conversation with Ottoman Army officer Rafael de Nogales, to bear no legal or moral responsibility for the systematic massacre of Christians in his province, as he only followed orders from Talat Pasha. According to De Nogales, "Talat had ordered the slaughter by a circular telegram, if my memory is correct, containing a scant three words: Yak – Vur – Oldur, meaning, 'Burn, demolish, kill'. The authenticity of that terrible phrase was confirmed by the press of Constantinople after the Armistice with the publication of a certain telegram, which the Ottoman commission engaged in investigating the massacres and deportations had discovered among the papers of the Committee of Union and Progress."

Süleyman Nazif, the former Vali of Mosul, had a very different opinion and testified after the Armistice, "The catastrophic deportations and murders in Diyarbekir were Reshid's work. He alone is responsible. He recruited people from the outside in order to perpetrate the killings. He murdered the Kaimakams in order to scare all other opposed Muslim men and women; he displayed the corpses of the Kaimakams in public."

On July 16, 1915, the German Consul at Mosul, Walter Holstein, reported to the German Embassy that, despite official denials, Reşit Bey had ordered his bodyguards to commit the recent assassination of Nuri Bey, the Kaimakam of Midyat, for having, "refused to let the Christians in his district be massacred."

According to Taner Akçam, Reşit Bey ordered the assassination of many other Muslims, including fellow Ottoman officials, policemen, and many civilians, for opposing the genocides, including Hüseyin Nesimi, the Kaimakam of Lice, Ferit, the Assistant-Vali of Basra, Bedri Nuri, the Mutasarrif of Müntefak, Sabit, the Kaimakam of Beşiri, and the journalist Ísmail Mestan.

All jewellery and other possessions that Reşit Bey "requisitioned" from massacred Christians were, in theory, to be forwarded to the central government's treasury. Talat Pasha's concern for missing valuables resulted in an investigation into Reşit for "embezzlement of State property", which easily proved that Reşit had amassed a personal fortune from the genocides. For this reason, in March 1916, Talat Pasha had Reşit removed from his post. Süleyman Nazif later commented, "Talat Pasha dismissed Reşit as a thief, while he adored him as murderer".

On 5 November 1918, a little less than a week after the Ottoman Empire surrendered to the Allies in the Armistice of Mudros, Reşit was arrested. His role in both the Armenian and Assyrian genocides was exposed in the Constantinople press, though he continued to deny having ever committed a crime.

When asked by CUP secretary general Mithat Şukru Bleda how he, as a doctor, could have had the heart to violate the Hippocratic Oath and send so many unarmed civilians to their deaths, Reshid Bey replied:

"Being a doctor could not cause me to forget my nationality! Reshid is a doctor. But he was born as a Turk....Either the Armenians were to eliminate the Turks, or the Turks were to eliminate the Armenians. I did not hesitate when I was confronted with this dilemma. My Turkishness prevailed over my profession. I figured, instead of wiping us out, we will wipe them out....On the question how I, as a doctor, could have murdered, I can answer as follows: the Armenians had become hazardous microbes in the body of this country. Well, isn’t it a doctor’s duty to kill microbes?"

When further asked by Bleda how history might remember him, Reshid simply responded, "Let other nations write about me whatever history they want, I couldn't care less."

Reshid Bey escaped from imprisonment in January 1919, but when government authorities cornered him he committed suicide by shooting himself in the head.

According to Hans-Lukas Kieser, despite being one of the worst genocide perpetrators Reşit "is perceived as a patriot and martyr in official Turkish-nationalist diction". In Ankara, a boulevard is named in his honour.

=== Aziz Feyzi Pirinççizâde ===
After the defeat of the Ottoman Empire in 1918, Aziz Feyzi Pirinççizâde transferred his support from Sultan Mehmed VI to the Turkish Republican Government based in Ankara Vilayet. On 15 January 1919, Feyzi was arrested and charged with involvement in the Armenian genocide. The British Government deported him to the Crown Colony of Malta in May 1919, where Feyzi was held for two years awaiting prosecution for war crimes as part of Group A, which was reserved for Turks and Kurds who were directly involved in the genocides. In 1921, Feyzi escaped with 15 fellow prisoners, returned to Turkey, and joined the Kemalists. Later in life, Feyzi was a facilitator of massacres and forced resettlements of the Kurdish people.

=== Talat Pasha ===
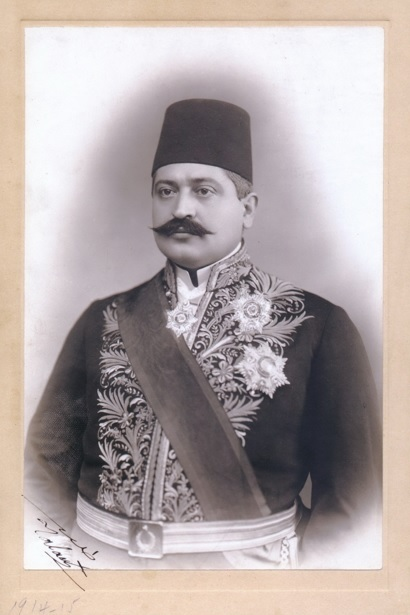
Talat Pasha

Talat Pasha, who is widely considered the mastermind of the Armenian, Assyrian, and Greek genocides, continued to skillfully mislead and calmly dismiss foreign diplomats, including those from the Ottoman Empire's Allies, who continued to demand an immediate end to all three. In his postwar memoirs, subsequent German Ambassador Count Johann Heinrich von Bernstorff recalled of Talat, "When I kept on pestering him about the Armenian question, he once said with a smile: 'What on earth do you want? The question is settled, there are no more Armenians.'"

Talat Pasha fled to the Weimar Republic in November 1918. An Ottoman Special Military Tribunal tried, convicted, and sentenced Talat to death in absentia for subverting the Constitution, war profiteering, and organizing genocide against Ottoman Greeks and Armenians. On March 15, 1921, Talat was assassinated in Berlin by Soghomon Tehlirian as part of Operation Nemesis, a worldwide plan by the Armenian Revolutionary Federation to hunt down and liquidate all surviving perpetrators of the Armenian genocide. After a two-day trial, a German court found Tehlirian not guilty of murder by reason of temporary insanity, and released him, much to the joyful applause of the German people who had attended his trial. As efforts to prosecute the genocide's perpetrators had ceased by this time, Tehlirian is considered a national hero by Armenians. In contrast, Talat Pasha's remains were later re-exhumed, repatriated, and buried at the Monument of Liberty in Istanbul and many streets throughout Turkey are named in his honour. This, and the Armenian genocide denial that is still at the heart of the official history promoted by the Turkish government, remains highly controversial worldwide.

== Legacy ==
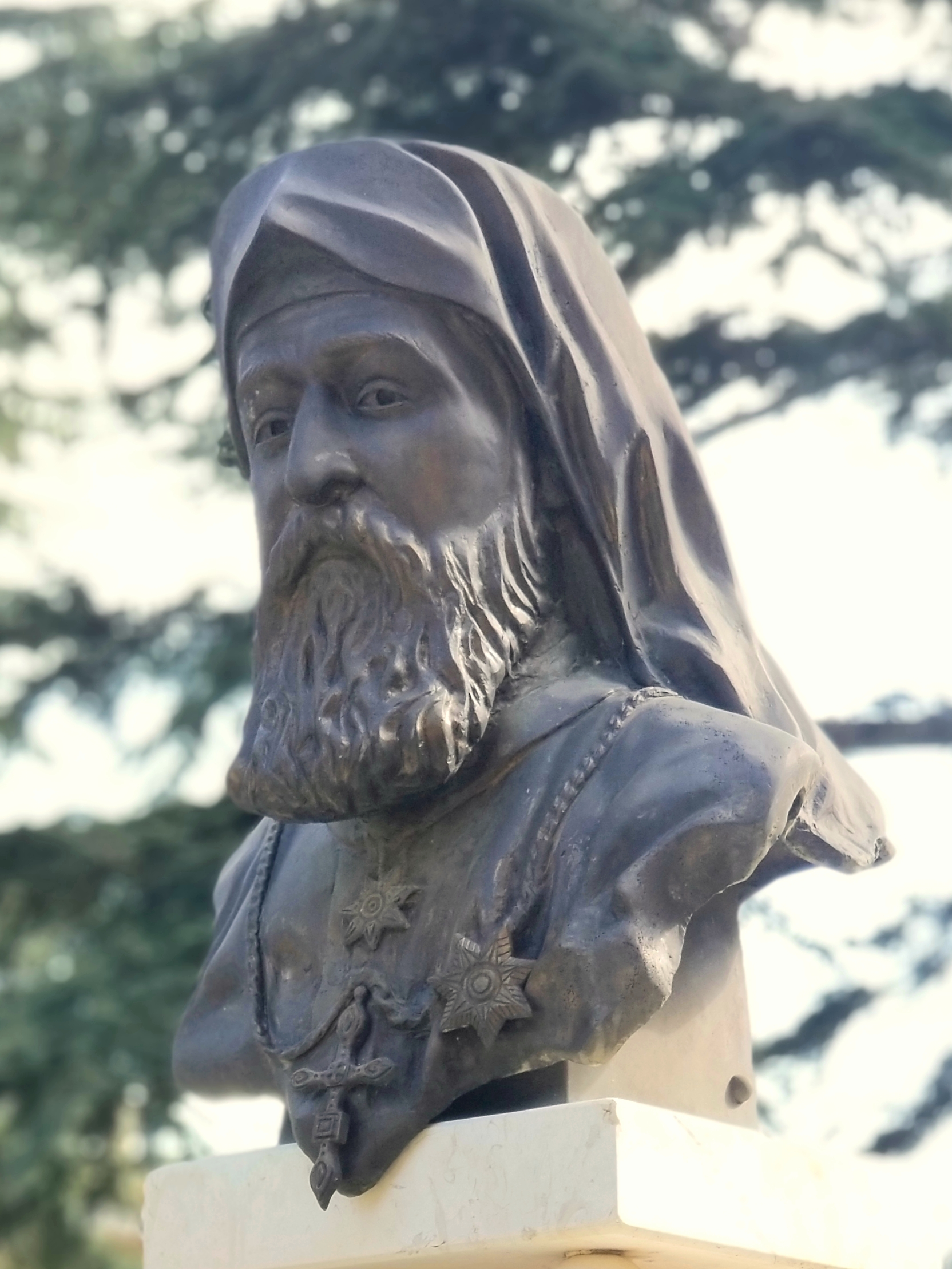
A memorial bust of Blessed Ignatius Maloyan at the Armenian Catholic Patriarchal Headquarters in Bzoummar, Lebanon

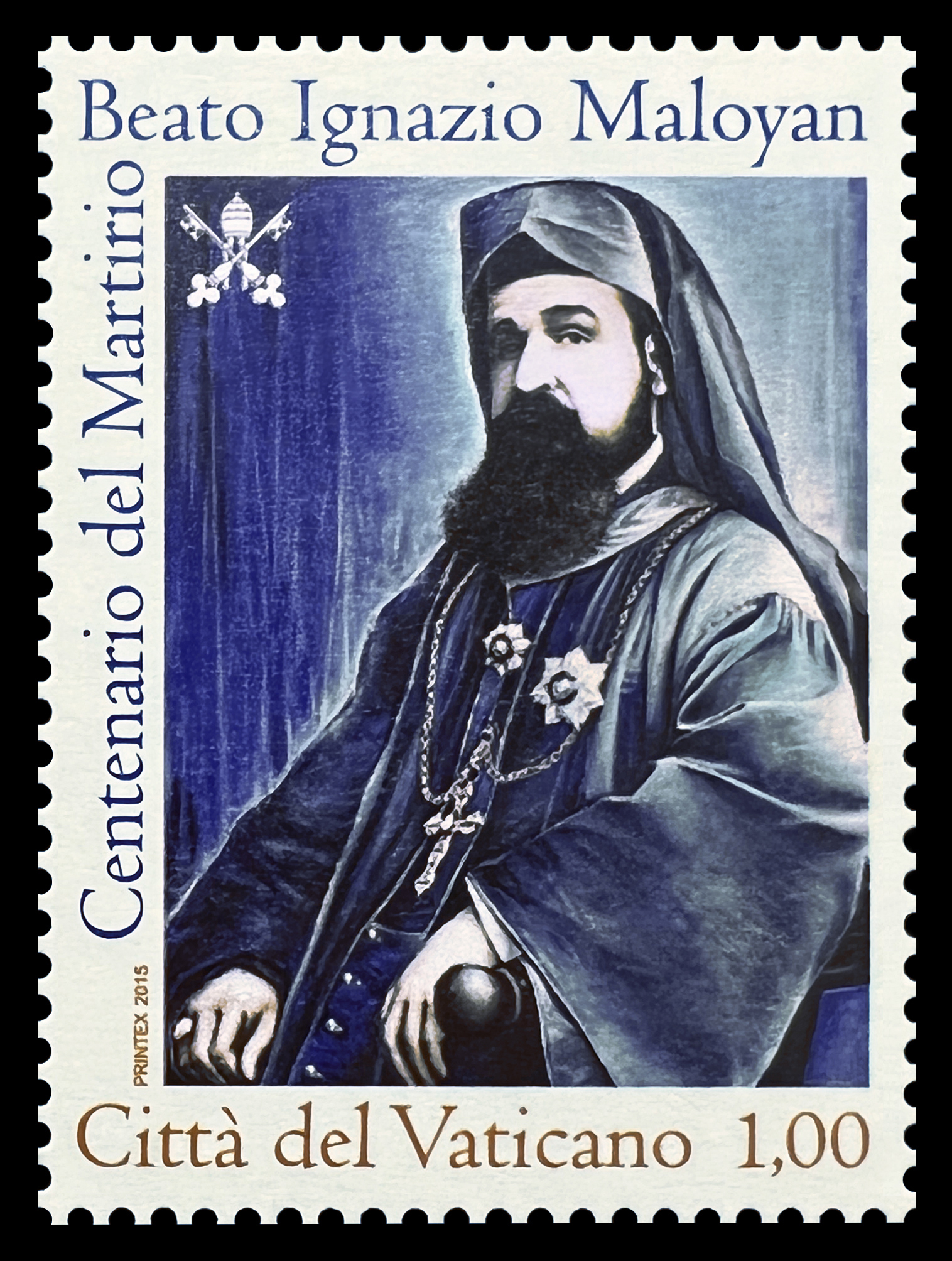
A 2015 stamp of Vatican City with Ignatius Maloyan

According to Donald Attwater, "During the massacres by Turks and Kurds in the war of 1914–1918, the Catholic Armenians lost seven bishops, over one hundred priests, forty-five nuns, and thirty-thousand lay folk; over eight hundred ecclesiastical buildings and schools were pillaged and destroyed, and a dozen dioceses laid waste. Moreover, the formation of a Soviet Socialist Republic in Russian Armenia cut off an indeterminate number of Catholics from their fellows. A conference of Armenian bishops at Rome in 1928 reorganized their Church in view of these events and of the conditions now obtaining."

According to Fr Ishaq Armalé, who survived the local Assyrian genocide by fleeing into Lebanon and published his diary in Beirut after the Armistice of Mudros, "Some leading Muslims employed Christian servants, who by hiding listened to what was said and told of the secrets. We did not believe them and said, 'Our friendship with the Muslims is purer than the eye of a rooster and stronger than iron. It would be impossible to turn such a friendship into hostility and mildness into harshness, because we have no conflicts with each other.' We added that in our area, there were no hundred percent Armenians or opponents to the government. No, we are, praise God, Catholics and loyal to the state and follow its decisions to the letter of the law. Therefore, it has no reason to harass us and claim that we are hostile and plot treason. … But we were disappointed. The truest friend and the dearest comrade became the worst and most distrustful enemy. The sheep became wolves and the doves became snakes."

According to David Gaunt, similarly to their superiors, both Ottoman Gendarmerie chief Memduh and mutasarrif Bedri Bey amassed illegal fortunes from the genocides against local Christians. Unlike Reshid Bey, however, neither was ever prosecuted or otherwise held accountable. During the rest of the war, the few surviving Christian clergy of Mardin spent vast sums to get their fellow Christians released and to buy the freedom of enslaved Christian children, who were on sale in the bazaar.

Since 1928, the Armenian Catholic Archeparchy of Istanbul, based at St. Mary of Sakızağaç Cathedral, has spiritually looked after all Catholic Armenians, who, despite widespread anti-Armenian sentiment, remain living in the Turkish Republic. Along with an unknown number of Hidden Armenians, as of 2008 the Armenian Catholic population of the Archeparchy numbered only 3,650.

Archbishop Ignatius Maloyan was beatified in Saint Peter's Basilica by Pope John Paul II on October 7, 2001. Although the resurfacing of Jacques Rhetoré's formerly lost memoirs during the 1991 Gulf War in Mosul certainly added to the evidence for Maloyan's martyrdom, it is almost certainly not a coincidence that the Vatican chose for Maloyan's Beatification ceremony to take place so soon after the September 11 attacks by Jihadists linked to Al-Qaeda.

In a sermon for the occasion, Pope John Paul said,

Archbishop Ignatius Maloyan, who died a martyr when he was 46, reminds us of every Christian's spiritual combat, whose faith is exposed to the attacks of evil. It is in the Eucharist that he drew, day by day, the force necessary to accomplish his priestly ministry with generosity and passion, dedicating himself to preaching, to a pastoral life connected with the celebration of the sacraments and to the service of the neediest. Throughout his existence, he fully lived the words of St Paul: "God has not given us a spirit of fear but a spirit of courage, of love and self control" (II Tim 1,14. 7). Before the dangers of persecution, Bl. Ignatius did not accept any compromise, declaring to those who were putting pressure on him, "It does not please God that I should deny Jesus my Saviour. To shed my blood for my faith is the strongest desire of my heart". May his example enlighten all those who today wish to be witnesses of the Gospel for the glory of God and for the salvation of their neighbour.

The Vatican City State commemorated the centennial of Blessed Ignatius Maloyan's martyrdom with a postage stamp issued on the 2 September 2015.

The Servant of God Leonard Melki, a Lebanese Capuchin priest who was deported in the same convoy and martyred at the Sheikhan Caves alongside Archbishop Maloyan, was Beatified by Pope Francis in Beirut on 4 June 2022.

== Canonization ==
On 31 March 2025, Pope Francis promulgated a decree of the Dicastery for the Causes of Saints announcing the canonization of Maloyan. He was canonized by Pope Leo XIV on October 19, 2025.

== Sources ==
- Gaunt, David (2006). Massacres, Resistance, Protectors: Muslim-Christian Relations in Eastern Anatolia during World War I. Gorgias Press.
- Üngör, Uğur; Polatel, Mehmet (2011), Confiscation and Destruction: The Young Turk Seizure of Armenian Property, London: Continuum International
