= Turkish opposition to the Armenian genocide =

During the Armenian Genocide, when 1.5 million Armenians were killed between 1915 and 1917, several Turkish civilians, politicians and military leaders refused to participate in the massacres and looting and tried to stop the deportation and massacre of Armenians. Many of these individuals lost their positions or lives as a result of their opposition. Despite individual cases of opposition against the genocide, the extent of public involvement was very high.

== Notable opponents ==
=== Ahmet Rıza ===
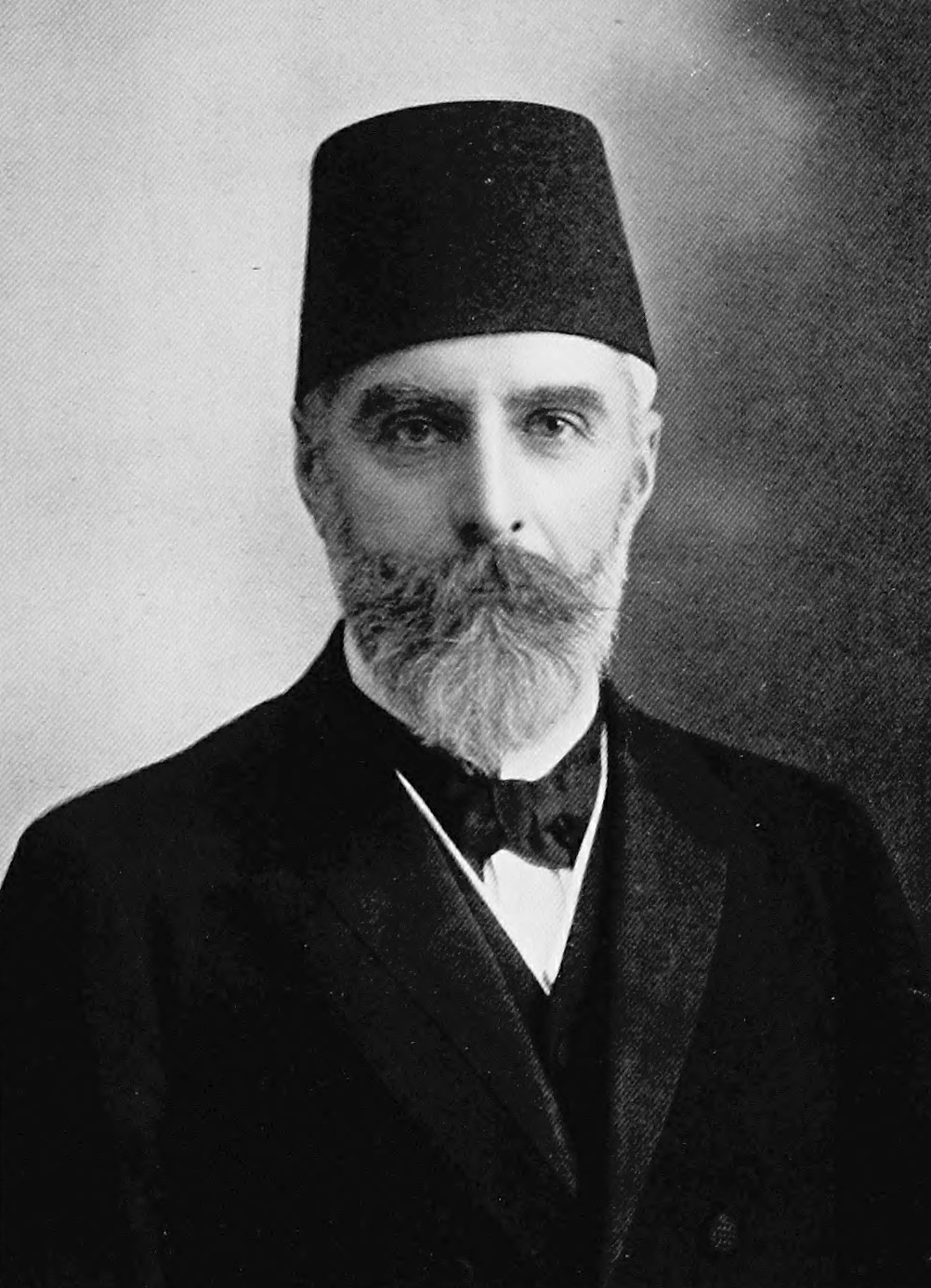
Ahmet Rıza, 1909

Ahmet Rıza, one of the leading founders of the Committee of Union and Progress, was one of the few Ottoman politicians who condemned the Armenian Genocide in 1915. Ahmet Rıza was also opposed to the Temporary Law of Deportation, saying that it was unconstitutional since the law was never voted on by the Ottoman Parliament. He then introduced a bill demanding the suspension of deportations until after the war and proposing to ensure the safety of the deportees. However, the bill was not accepted. The controversy caused by Rıza and the problems he brought out showed that no deputies were informed about the Relocation Law. On November 30, 1915, regarding the law on the confiscation of Armenian property, Ahmet Rıza said "It is also illegal to classify the properties specified in the law as abandoned property, because the Armenians who were the owners of these properties did not leave them voluntarily, they were exiled, they were forcibly expelled." in the parliament. Noting that such a confiscation is against the constitution, he added: "Expel me from my village at gunpoint, then sell my property: This is never lawful. Neither Ottoman conscience nor law can accept this."

=== Faik Ali Ozansoy ===
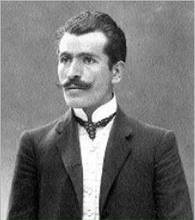
Faik Ali Ozansoy

Faik Ali Ozansoy was serving as the governor of Kütahya when the Temporary Law of Deportation was enacted. When the Deportation Law was first enacted, his brother Süleyman Nazif, in a letter to Ali Faik, tried to persuade him not to participate in the deportations "for the honor of their families". When he was ordered to be deported from Istanbul, Faik Ali refused to implement it, despite the pressures of Talaat Pasha; on the contrary, he said that the Armenians who were deported to other places via Kütahya should be kept there when they come to Kütahya and that they should be treated well during this time. Shortly after, he was summoned to Istanbul to explain his behavior. The memoirist Stepan Stepanian describes Faik Ali's encounter with Talaat Pasha as follows:

Talaat asked him why he did not deport the Armenians of his city.

He said that the Armenians of his sanjak have always been loyal Ottomans and have always lived like brothers with the Turks.

Talaat points out that the deportation decision is for all Armenians and that there can be no exception to this decision.

Faik Ali Bey said, "Then I don't want to be a murderer. Please accept my resignation and find a successor willing to implement such a policy."

Only then, Talaat said, "Okay, okay. Take your Armenians and stay where you are."

Seeing the invitation of Faik Ali to Istanbul as an opportunity, Kütahya police chief Kemal Bey threatened the Armenians in the city that they would be deported if they did not convert to Islam. The Armenians decided to change their religion. When Faik Ali returned and found out about this, he met the situation with anger. He dismissed the chief of police and asked the Armenians if they still wanted to convert to Islam. All the Armenians, except one, decided to remain Christian. Faik Ali's brother, Süleyman Nazif, was instrumental in persuading Faik Ali to protect the Armenians. Despite his resignation applications, Faik Ali was not removed from his position and continued to serve as the governor of Kütahya. During this period, he protected the entire Armenian population of Kütahya.

After the Armenian Genocide, Faik Ali refused a gift of 500 gold pieces to be given to him by the Armenians and instead spent the gold on improving the living conditions of the Armenian refugees. The gold was used to build a soup kitchen and a school. Faik Ali appointed Stepan Stepanian as the first principal of the opened school. After the Armenian Genocide, the Armenian community of Kütahya put an inscription of gratitude for Faik Ali in the Kütahya Armenian Church. Today, every year on April 24, members of the Armenian community of Kütahya come to his grave and pay their respects to his memory.

=== Hasan Mahzar Bey ===
Hasan Mahzar Bey, who was appointed as the governor of Ankara on 18 June 1914, was one of the Ottoman governors who refused to implement the deportation orders. Therefore, in August 1915, he was dismissed as the governor of Ankara and Atıf Bey, a prominent member of the Special Organization, was appointed in his place. Later, Mazhar described this event as follows:

One day, Atıf Bey came to me and verbally conveyed the order of the authorities to kill the Armenians during the deportation. I said, "No, Mr. Atif. I'm a governor, not a bandit, I can't do that, I will leave this post and you can come and do it if you want."

— Hasan Mahzar Bey

Mazhar reported that after his dismissal, "the looting of Armenian property in the region, both by the officials and the people, reached incredible proportions."

=== Hüseyin Nesimi Bey ===
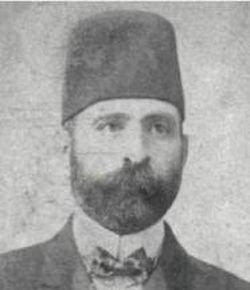
Hüseyin Nesimi Bey

Mehmed Reshid Bey, who was the governor of Diyarbekir vilayet during the genocide, preferred to exterminate the Armenians in the Diyarbekir region with a quick massacre instead of a long and painstaking deportation, and organized the mass murder of all Armenians in Diyarbekir. Meanwhile, Hüseyin Nesimi, who was the Lice district governor, refused to hand over the Lice Armenians with a total population of 5,980 to the units sent by Reshid Bey and protected them. Thereupon, Reshid summoned Hüseyin Nesimi to Diyarbakır to discuss the matter, but a group of Chechen soldiers hired him to stop and kill him on the way. On June 15, 1915, Hüseyin Nesimi was killed by Chechen soldiers and his body was dumped in a roadside ditch. Since that day, the area where the murder took place has been known as governor's tomb. With the death of Nesimi Bey, the massacre of the Armenians in Lice began and thousands of Armenians were killed.

=== Mehmet Celal Bey ===
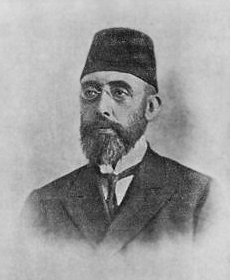
Mehmet Celal Bey, 1911

Mehmet Celal Bey was the governor of Konya vilayet, which was the center of the roads through which Armenians were deported from northern and western Anatolia to the Syrian Desert. Celal Bey, who was also the governor of the Aleppo vilayet before his duty as the governor of Konya and witnessed the fate of the Armenians during this time, knew what would happen if the Armenians survived their deportation on these roads and reached the Deir ez-Zor camps. He tried to convince the leaders of the Committee of Union and Progress by saying that there was no Armenian revolt in Anatolia and Aleppo and therefore there was no reason for the deportation of the Armenians. However, the situation intensified when one of Celal Bey's subordinates in Zeitun arrested and executed several prominent Armenians in Zeitun and Maraş following the Armenian revolt that had started in the region. As a result of this, Celal Bey was dismissed as governor of Aleppo and transferred to Konya. When he started his duty there, he refused to plan and organize the deportation of Armenians in Konya, despite repeated orders from the Sublime Porte, and repeatedly requested the authorities to provide shelter for the displaced Armenians. In addition to these demands, he sent many telegrams and letters of protest to the Sublime Porte stating that "the measures taken against the Armenians are against the high interests of the motherland in every respect". But their demands and protests were ignored. Celal Bey was able to protect some Armenians passing through Konya while being deported from other provinces. When an envoy sent to him by the Sublime Porte during this period said that the deportation of Armenians was a "national ideal", Celal Bey said:

What national ideal? Turks and Muslims were crying because of these murders, but they could not find a way to prevent it. Calling such atrocities a national ideal is the greatest slander and insult for the nation.

— Mehmet Celal Bey

Celal Bey saved the lives of thousands of Armenians until he was removed from his duty as the governor of Konya on October 3, 1915. Within 3 days of his dismissal, the remaining 10,000 Armenians in the region were deported. In his 3-part article published on the front page of Vakit on 10–13 December 1918, he stated that he did his best to prevent the ill-treatment suffered by Armenian citizens during the deportation, but he had to leave his post because he could not prevent them. In his memoirs about the governorship of Konya, Celal Bey said the following about himself:

I was a person sitting by the side of a river, with absolute no means of saving anyone. Blood was flowing in the river and thousands of innocent children, irreproachable old people, helpless women, strong young men, were streaming down this river towards oblivion. Anyone I could save with my bare hands I saved, and the others, I think they streamed down the river never to return.

=== Ali Sami Bey ===
Ali Sami Bey, a former Ottoman naval officer who fought for Greece during the Greco-Turkish War (1919–1922), leading a militia and attaining the rank of colonel. He was one of few Ottomans speaking against the genocide as late as 1922.

Ali Sami Bey was an Ottoman naval officer, photographer, journalist and newspaper publisher. He worked as a photographer for Sultan Abdülhamid II before losing his official positions following the Young Turk Revolution. He later settled in Thessaloniki and became an opponent of the Turkish National Movement.

During the Greco-Turkish War (1919–1922), he supported the Greek campaign in Anatolia, fighting for Greece, leading a militia and attaining the rank of colonel. He also published an anti-Kemalist newspaper, notably condemning the Armenian genocide and the Greek genocide. After the war, he remained in Greece, where he continued his photography work throughout the country, especially on Mount Athos.

In 1922, he wrote in his newspaper:

We are in the twentieth century, Mustapha Kemal and his men are undefined criminals. You the so-called civilised France, behold the massacres of Samsoun! Your assistance to the Kemalists constitutes the greatest crime. You have been the cause of the disappearance of thousands of Greeks and Armenians beneath the feet of these criminals. You, Mr. Poincaré, should be aware that the responsibility of hundreds and thousands of Greeks and Armenians in Pontus and Cilicia falls greatly upon France, whose alliance with Kemal has given rise to these atrocities. History will record in black letters this injustice committed by France. In the name of my fellow country-men, I protest against this wrong.

=== Mustafa Azizoğlu Bey ===
Mustafa Azizoğlu Bey was working as a governor in Malatya, a city where the deportation roads passed during the beginning of the deportation. Although he was unsuccessful in his efforts to prevent the deportations, he began to hide several Armenians in his own home. Mustafa's son, a loyal member of the Committee of Union and Progress, killed his own father "for taking care of the infidels".

== Penalties ==
Talaat Pasha ordered the Fourth Army to bring every Muslim who cooperated with the Christians to a military court. Similarly, the commander of the Third Army, Mahmut Kamil Pasha, told his soldiers to "hang every Muslim who protects an Armenian, in front of their house".

Politicians and military leaders who opposed the deportation and massacre of Armenians were mostly dismissed, and some were later killed by the Committee of Union and Progress or other leaders willing to carry out the massacres of Armenians. An example of the names known for dismissing and killing other leaders who opposed the genocide was the governor of Diyarbekir, Mehmed Reshid Bey. Governor of Çermik district Mehmet Hamdi Bey, Governor of Savur district Mehmet Ali Bey, Governor of Silvan district İbrahim Hakkı Bey, Governor of Mardin district Hilmi Bey and later Governor of Mardin district Şefik Bey; were among the politicians expelled by Reşit Bey in 1915 for not complying with the deportation orders. Nuri Bey, who first served as the district governor of Midyat and then Derik, was dismissed by Reshid Bey because he did not follow the deportation orders and was later killed by Reshid Bey's guards. On June 15, 1915, Hüseyin Nesimi Bey, who was protecting the Lice Armenians, was killed by Reshid Bey in an attack against him by some Chechen soldiers. Some journalists opposed to the deportations, such as İsmail Mestan, were among those killed by Reshid Bey. Mustafa Azizoğlu, one of the governors working to protect the Armenians, was killed by his own son "for taking care of the infidels".
