= Aziz Feyzi Pirinççizâde =

Kurdish politician

- Aziz Feyzi Pirinççizâde
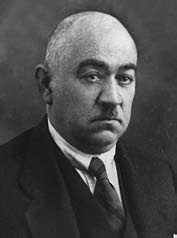

Minister of Public Works
- Preceded by: Office established
- Succeeded by: Office abolished

Personal details
- Born: 1878 Diyarbakir, Ottoman Empire
- Died: 17 February 1933 (aged 60) Istanbul, Turkey
- Party: Committee of Union and Progress (CUP)
- Children: Vefik Pirinççioğlu; Cahit Sıtkı Tarancı
- Parent: Arif Pirinççizâde
- Occupation: Politician
- Known for: 1915 genocide in Diyarbekir
- Awards: Medal of Independence

Aziz Feyzi Pirinççizâde (born 1878, Diyarbakır – 17 February 1933) was an Ottoman Kurdish politician, an member of Committee of Union and Progress and a leading member of the influential Pirinççizâde family from Diyarbakir. He took a leading role in the Armenian genocide in the Diyarbekir vilayet during World War I, and he was later accused of taking part in the Sheikh Said rebellion, although he wasn't sentenced for either. Later he served as a Member of the Grand National Assembly of Turkey and a Minister of Public Works in the Turkish Government. He was also awarded the Turkish Medal of Independence.

== Biography ==
As a member of the Ottoman Parliament for Diyarbakir, he was one of the main precursors of the persecution of the Armenians. After the peasantry population diminished due to the persecution of the Armenians in certain provinces of the Ottoman Empire, he advocated for the settlement of Kurdish tribesmen in the affected areas, in order to prevent German aspirations to have a say in these regions. He also instigated against the Governor of Diyarbekir Hamid Bey, who was known to be rather tolerant towards the Armenian population. Hamid Bey was replaced by Mehmed Reshid on the 25 March 1915, who was to become infamous for his role in the extermination of the Christian population. Onwards he was an assistant to Mehmed Reshid, and a major force behind the chasing of the Armenian Christian community. He organized the arson of the market of Diyarbekir in August 1914 together with other adherents to the Young Turks. One of them was the local commander of the police, Memduh Bey, whose release from custody he successfully demanded, after he was charged with it. During the fire, a Muslim mob destroyed many Christian shops.

He was also a member of parliament where he reportedly held disputes with the Armenian deputy Vartkes Serengülian. He and his cousin Bekir Sidki Pirinççizâde assumed a leading role in the massacres of the Armenian population of Diyarbekir. Both were involved in the Committee of Inquiry set up by Mehmed Reshid in order to find a solution to the Armenian question. Aziz Feyzi as a member of the committee, and his cousin as a captain of the militia unit, which carried out the orders of the committee.

In May 1915, Mehmed Reshid sent Aziz Feyzi to Mardin in order to organize the persecution of the Christians. In Mardin, Hilmi Bey has so far successfully prevented the persecution of the local Christian community. Furthermore, local Turkish and Kurdish leaders had refused to take part in the Hamidian massacres. According to the detailed Arabic diary of Syriac Catholic priest Fr. Ishaq Armalé, Feyzi declared upon his arrival, "Let no Christian remain! He who does not do this duty is no longer a Muslim." Feyzi added, "The time has come to save Turkey from its national enemies, that is, the Christians. It is clear that the states of Europe will not punish us, because Germany is on our side and helps us."

According to Fr. Jacques Rhétoré, a French Dominican priest interned in Mardin, a large meeting was held in Mardin on May 15, 1915. During the meeting, Feyzi mocked those who objected to murdering Christians as follow:

You surprise me. What is holding you back? Is it the fear of one day having to pay for this? But what happened to those who killed Armenians in Abdul Hamid’s time? Today Germany is with us and our enemies are its enemies. This will surely give us victory in this war, and we won’t have to answer to anyone. Let us get rid of the Christians so we can be masters in our own house. This is what the government wants.

—

Everyone present at the meeting was required to sign a petition that Mardin's Christians were traitors and needed to be eliminated. Following, he was deployed to Cizre, to continue with the persecution of the Christian population. After the surrender of the Ottoman Empire in 1918, he supported the Revolutionary Government based in Ankara.

== Prosecution and release ==
He was arrested on 15 January 1919 and charged with involvement in the Armenian genocide. The British deported him to Malta in May 1919, where he was in custody for two years in the citadel in Group A, which was reserved for the ones, who were directly involved in the massacres. In 1921, he managed to escape the island with 15 fellow inmates and returned to the Anatolian mainland to join the Kemalists. During the Sheikh Said Rebellion, and despite having taken the Kemalist side from the beginning, he was initially accused of supporting the rebellion, since he had relatives who took part in it, and thus Feyzi had to appear before the Independence Tribunal, but was finally acquitted.

== Later life ==
Following the suppression of the Sheikh Said rebellion, he was a facilitator of massacres and resettlements of the Kurdish population. He was the Minister of Public Works during Revolutionary Government under Fevzi Çakmak, again in the Government of Ali Fethi from November 1924 to March 1925. In May 1927, he was awarded the Independence Medal by Abdulhalik Renda, at the time the speaker of the Grand National Assembly of Turkey.

== Family ==
Aziz Feyzi was the son of Arif Pirinççizâde, the father of the politician Vefik Pirinççioğlu.
