= Maloyan =

Maloyan is a surname. Notable people with the surname include:

- Artur Maloyan (born 1989), Russian footballer
- Ignatius Maloyan (1869–1915), Armenian Eastern Catholic archbishop
