= Armenian Catholic Archeparchy of Mardin =

Eastern Catholic archeparchy in Turkey and Iraq

Archeparchy of Mardin Archeparchia Mardinensis Armenorum

Location
- Territory: some territory of Turkey and Iraq
- Headquarters: Mardin, Turkey
- Population: 2,500 (in 1949)

Information
- Sui iuris church: Armenian Catholic
- Rite: Armenian
- Established: 1708
- Dissolved: 1972
- Cathedral: Armenian Catholic Cathedral of Surp Hovsep in Mardin

Leadership
- Archbishop: Nersès Tayroyan (last eparchial bishop).

The Archeparchy of Mardin is a titular see and was historically a non-metropolitan Archeparchy of the Armenian Catholic Church, covering Turkey and Iraq.

In 1907, were 8,000 Armenian Catholics, 16 Armenian priests, 8 churches, and 10 chapels in the archeparchy. Between 3 and 4 June 1915, during the Armenian Genocide, 420 of the leading Christians of Mardin including the archbishop of Mardin, Saint Ignatius Maloyan, were arrested. Many were forced to march into the desert and were killed for their faith.

== History ==
- 1708: Established on territory split off from the Armenian Catholic Archeparchy of Cilicia.
- 29 June 1954: from its territory was established Armenian Catholic Archeparchy of Baghdad and Armenian Catholic Eparchy of Qamishli
- 1972: Suppressed and divided between the Armenian Catholic Archeparchy of Baghdad and Armenian Catholic Archeparchy of Istanbul.

== Archbishops ==
1. Melchior Tasbasian (1708–1716)
2. Mardiros Markar Tahmanian (1722–1737)
3. Melkon Markar Tahmanian (1740–1767)
4. Jean Tasbasian (1768–1771)
5. Joseph Balithian (1772–1773)
6. Pierre Eliazarian, O.S.Antoine (1775–1787)
7. Joachim Tasbasian (1788–1836)
8. Abraham Kandilian (1836–1838)
9. Joseph Ferrabian, ICPB (1838–1854)
10. Gabriele Chachathian (1855–1863)
11. Melchiorre Nazarian (1863–1900)
12. Hussig Gulian (1902–1911)
13. St. Ignatius Maloyan, I.C.P.B. (1911–1915), martyred
14. Jacques Nessimian (1928–1933), appointed Archbishop of the Armenian Catholic Eparchy of Alexandria
15. Ignatius Bedros XVI Batanian (1933–1940) appointed Titular Archbishop of Gabula, later appointed Catholicos Patriarch of Cilicia
16. Nersès Tayroyan (1940–1954), appointed Archbishop of the Armenian Catholic Archeparchy of Baghdad

=== Titular Archbishops ===
1. Vartán Waldir Boghossian, SDB (1981–1989), appointed, Bishop of Armenian Catholic Eparchy of San Gregorio de Narek en Buenos Aires
2. Vartan Kechichian, CAM (2001–2017)
