= Massacres of Diyarbekir (1895) =

Mass killings of Armenians and Assyrians in the Ottoman Empire

Massacres of Diyarbakır (1895)
- Part of Hamidian massacres
- Location: Diyarbekir Vilayet, Ottoman Empire
- Date: 1895
- Attack type: Mass murder
- Deaths: 25,000
- Perpetrators: Kurdish irregulars, Ottoman governors
- Motive: Anti-Armenian and Anti-Assyrian agitation

The massacres of Diyarbakır were massacres that took place in the Diyarbekir Vilayet of the Ottoman Empire between the years of 1894 and 1896 by Muslims, a majority of whom were ethnic Kurds. The events were part of the Hamidian massacres and targeted the vilayet's Christian population – mostly Armenians and Assyrians.

The massacres were initially directed at Armenians, instigated by Ottoman politicians and clerics under the pretext of their desire to dismantle the state, but they soon changed into a general anti-Christian pogrom as the killing moved to the Diyarbekir Vilayet and surrounding areas of Tur Abdin, which were inhabited by ethnic Assyrian Christians. Contemporary accounts put the total number of Assyrians killed between 1894 and 1896 at around 25,000.

== Background ==
Kurdish raids on villages in the Diyarbekir Vilayet intensified in the years following a famine that ravaged the region. This was followed by fierce battles between Kurds and Mhallami Arabs. In August 1888, Kurdish Aghas led attacks on Assyrian villages in Tur Abdin killing 18. Requests for an investigation by Patriarch Ignatius Peter IV went unanswered by the Ottoman Porte. Another Kurdish raid in October 1889 targeted several Assyrian Christian villages during which 40 villagers including women and children were killed. These events were the first signs of the massacres that would characterise the Diyarbekir Vilayet for the following decade.

The Hamidian massacres came when some 4,000 Armenians in the Sasun district of Bitlis Vilayet in 1894 rebelled against Kurdish tribes, who demanded traditional taxes from them. Local authorities reported this to the Sultan as a major revolt. The Sultan responded by sending the Ottoman army supported by the Hamidiye cavalry and local Kurdish tribes. After clashing with the Armenian rebels, the Kurds descended upon Armenian villages in the regions of Sasun (Sassoun) and Talori, between Muş and Silvan, massacring its inhabitants and burning several Christian villages. More than 7,500 Armenians died as a result, and an intervention by European powers lead to the dismissal of the Governor of Bitlis, Bahri Paşa, in January 1895. Three European Powers - Britain, France and Russia - thinking that reform of the Ottoman local government would help to prevent violence as occurred in Sasun, proposed to Sultan Abdul Hamid II a reform plan, planning control of the Kurds and the employment of Christian assistant-governors. The Sultan was unwilling to yield to the desires of the Powers. During the Spring and Summer of 1895 months of unfruitful negotiations passed. After a demonstration in Constantinople on September 30, 1895, organised by the Armenian Hunchakian Party to ask for speedy enactment of the reforms, Christian neighbourhoods in the city were attacked by angry Muslim mobs and the city descended into chaos. The massacre in Constantinople was followed by more Muslim-Armenian conflict in other areas, always costing the lives of vastly more Christians than Muslims. Western pressure on the Sultan increased, and he eventually gave in to their demands and a Firman of the reforms was issued in October 1895.

In retrospect, the announcement of the reforms only exacerbated the already heated atmosphere in the Ottoman Empire. As news of clashes and massacres spread throughout the empire Diyarbekir also took its share, with Muslim-Christian distrust reaching unprecedented levels. Generally Muslims had a distorted view of what the European-inspired reforms would mean. Muslims, also in Diyarbakır, thought that an Armenian Kingdom was about to be created under protection of European Powers and the end of Islamic rule was imminent. Muslim civilians bought large amounts of weapons and ammunition. The influential Kurdish Sheikh of Zilan, who played an important role in the massacres of Armenians in Sasun and Mush in the previous year, was present in the city inciting the Muslims against Christians. It was rumoured that Kurdish tribal leaders outside the town had promised to send 10,000 Kurdish fighters to avenge themselves. Muslim notables in Diyarbakır, who had lost their trust in the Sultan, telegraphed him that:

Armenia was conquered with blood, it will only be yielded with blood.

== Massacre in the city of Diyarbakır, 1–3 November 1895 ==
=== Prelude to the massacre ===
On 4 October 1895, Mehmed Enis Pasha, an official highly disliked among the city's Christians for his alleged role in a fire that destroyed Christian shops in Mardin, was appointed the governor of the city. The governor tried to force the Christian notables and communal leaders to sign telegrams of gratitude to Constantinople for his appointment. This provoked a harsh reaction from the Armenians and the Assyrians; Armenian shops were closed down, people protested in their churches, prevented masses, and continuously rang the bells "for three days and three nights". A petition was signed by 1200 people and was sent to the Armenian Patriarchate to protest their support for the governor, the Assyrian bishop of the city was forced to seek refuge in the French consulate. The protests continued until a response was received from the Patriarchate, which took ten days.

This caused significant discontent among the Muslims, the army commander reportedly prevented the torching of Christian shops. The announcement of the reforms exacerbated the violent tendencies and "sinister rumors" of plans by Muslims began to circulate. The governor warned the Muslims to refrain from any attacks on Christians, reminding them that Islam banned murder. However, on his official taking of the office on 31 October, no Christian communal leaders were present.

=== The massacre ===
The massacres began in the city of Diyarbekir on 1 November 1895, after unidentified individuals fired shots outside the Grand Mosque ("Ulu Cami") in the city centre during the midday Muslim Prayer. The French consul, Meyrier, received reports that a policeman had first shot a Chaldean Catholic passing by during the prayers, while Ottoman documents reported that Armenians had begun shooting while the Muslims were praying. Muslims began attacking Armenians in the surroundings, soon the violence turned against all Christians and spread throughout the city. They then started looting, and were joined by common civilians and government officials alike. The entire market area was set on fire, the fire soon got out of control and destroyed hundreds of shops and workshops, with smoke visible from Ergani, at a distance of 55 km. The Christians who could not run away from the mob were shot. The financial losses on the first day were estimated at two million Turkish Pounds.

Attacks on Christian neighbourhoods began the following morning in a systematic manner: houses were looted and burned; men, women and children killed; and girls were kidnapped and converted to Islam. The French vice-consul writes that the authorities had to close the city gates "fearing the coming of Kurdish tribes on the outskirts of the city, which do not differentiate between Muslims and Christians in their raids". Some Christians were able to protect themselves with the few weapons that they had owned in narrow streets which were defendable. More than 3,000 Christian of all denominations gathered at the monastery of the Capuchin Fathers in the city, and about 1,500 were protected by the French Consulate. The French Consulate was then targeted by the mob, who shot at the walls. While the consulate did not fall, there was significant fear that it would be captured, and the consul reportedly ordered his wife and children to be shot if that was the case. Only a brief telegram appealing for help could be sent to the embassy in Constantinople.

The Diyarbekir massacres continued to the third day, but later ended upon the orders of the governor, proclaiming that anybody caught using weapons would receive severe punishment. However, before the order, law enforcement officials had participated in the looting. There was no participation from Kurds outside the city; 2500 of them gathered outside the city walls but not let in.

There are varying estimates regarding the death toll in the city. The official Ottoman report of the provincial government gave it as 480 Christians and 130 Muslims. However, Meyrier reported 1191 Christian death (including, but not limited to, 1000 Armenians and 150 Assyrians), and 195 Muslims. Meyrier also reported 2000 missing people, but Hallward, the British Vice-Consul who came to Diyarbekir the following year, determined a Christian death toll around 1000, implying that the missing had survived and been accounted for. 155 women were kidnapped by Kurds.

Many Christians survived the killings by converting to Islam at gunpoint. According to some accounts, some 25,000 Armenians turned to Islam during the massacres. Many of them returned to Christianity after the end of the period of persecution and returned to their villages once again.

William Ainger Wigram visited the region a few years later and witnessed the traces of the destruction. According to him, the Assyrians of the city of Diyarbekir suffered less than their Armenian co-religionists whose district was still completely demolished. He also observed strong anti-Christian sentiments among the city's Muslims.

== Massacres to the East of Diyarbakır ==
Massacres in the countryside continued for 46 days after the initial massacres in Diyarbakır city. In the village of Sa'diye inhabited by 3000 Armenians and Assyrians, the Kurds first killed the men, then the women and finally the children. A group of villagers attempted to shelter in a church but the Kurds burnt it and killed those inside. Only three made it out alive by hiding amongst the corpses. In Mayafaraqin (Silvan, Farkin), a town of 3000 mixed Armenian, Jacobite and Protestant Christians, only 15 survived the killings, the rest were killed in a manner similar to what happened Sa'diye. The Assyrian village of Qarabash was destroyed and in Qatarball only 4 people survived of 300 families: most of the villagers died after being burnt alive in the church they had gathered. Isaac Armalet, a contemporary Syriac Catholic priest, counts 10 more villages which were entirely erased from the map, amounting to a total of 4,000 victims.

Uğur Ümit Üngör gives the number of Armenians killed in the "outlying villages" of Diyarbakır as 800–900. The total number of people left in need of nutrition and shelter in the province was estimated at 50,000 by Meyrier, Hallward later revised the figure to 20,000-30,000 (excluding Mardin and Palu). Hallward gave the number of homeless people in Silvan as 10,000.

== Massacres in Tur Abdin ==
Mardin, the largest city and the capital of the subprovince (sancak) of Mardin, was spared the massacres inflicted on the other sancak's of Diyarbakır. Many of its Muslim notables were anxious in protecting their own interests and wanted to maintain the tolerant image of the city. The city was also characterized by the fact that the neighbourhoods of Muslims and Christians were intermingled, making it difficult to distinguish between them: the Muslims knew that the entry of outside forces would lead to an indiscriminate massacre of its inhabitants. The first Kurds entered the city on 9 November, coming from the village of Ain Sinja which they had destroyed. A local Muslim force confronted them and drove them back. The Governor then arranged the city's defenses and also distributed weapons among its Christian population. Two subsequent attempts by the Kurds to break into the city also failed. It was only at the end of November that the governor of Diyarbakır issued an order to protect the churches, although the atmosphere remained tense until the spring of 1896. Despite the protection of the Christians of Mardin, the neighboring villages in Tur Abdin faced a different fate. The village of Tell Armen was completely sacked and burned and its church partially destroyed; al-Kulye, made up of about 2,000 Jacobite individuals was also destroyed and burned down, killing about 50 of its inhabitants; Banabil was also attacked and destroyed. While al-Mansurye survived after receiving support from nearby villages, the village of Qalaat Mara, seat of the Jacobite Patriarch, was abandoned after the Kurds attacked it. Its residents sought refuge at the Saffron Monastery, were they arranged their defenses and were able to resist the attacks of the Kurds for five days. Father Armalet cites two different versions about the role of the Ottoman army: In the first one, the army aided the Kurds in attacking the monastery, killing 70 Assyrians. The governor then sent 30 soldiers who accompanied the besieged to their villages and provide them with protection. In the second version, which agrees with the official story, the Kurds attacked the monastery on their own, the Mutasarrif sent a force which ordered the Kurds to withdraw, and when they did not, the Ottoman force attacked them and killed 80 men.

Historians agree that the town of Jezireh east of Tur Abdin, stayed calm and secure during the massacres, however, villages around Midyat were not spared from the destruction and killings and the Dominican friar father Gallant witnessed scenes of destruction as he passed in these areas in 1896.

The Assyrian population of the Sanjak of Mardin declined sharply after the massacres. In an estimate prior to the First World War, Christians formed roughly two-fifths of its population of 200,000. Tur Abdin had ceased to be a "Christian island" as Christians now numbered about 50% of its population of 45,000.

== Stance of the Syriac Orthodox Church ==
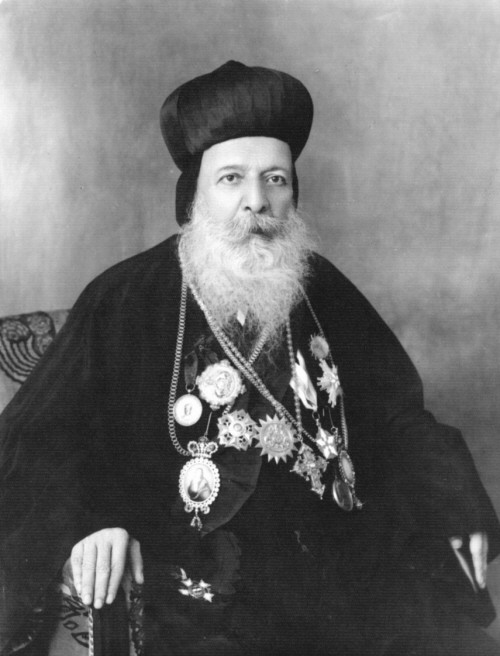
Ignatius Afram I Barsoum.

The official story of the Syriac Orthodox Church about the events varies considerably from views shared by historians and contemporaries. In his version of the events compiled in the 1940s, Patriarch Ignatius Ephrem I Barsoum tries to confront the official Turkish version. He mentioned that Patriarch Ignatius Abdul Masih II hurried to Diyarbakır upon hearing the news of an Armenian massacre and sent a telegram to the Sultan obtaining an order to protect the Assyrians. He then goes to compare the Church to Noah's Ark, for being a shelter of its sons. In father Armalet's version, the Patriarch sent a messenger to the governor, but he was killed, the message however reached the governor who asked for the Patriarch to meet him. The latter crossed the city, walking over the corpses of dead Christians. The governor then welcomed him and asked him to take refuge with his followers in the main Assyrian church of the city. According to an oral tradition, the massacres caused the patriarch to lose his mind and he started drinking after he returned to Mardin and was later deposed. He then went to Kerala in India where he nominated new bishops, resulting in a schism among Saint Thomas Christians that still exists.

According to Patriarch Barsoum, Tur Abdin was also spared when two Assyrian notables sent a request for protection from the Ottoman authorities in Diyarbakır. The governor later sent a force that expelled the Kurds and guarded the villages until April 1896.

Several sources mention that the Ottoman authorities had forced the senior clerics, including the Patriarch of the Syriac Orthodox Church to sign official documents stating that the chaos was caused by an Armenian revolt. This led to a widespread contempt among Christians who occupied churches and prevented the clergy from celebrating the mass. Some priests were even manhandled by them. This was one of the reasons put forward by the Ottoman authorities to justify some of the killings.

== See also ==
- Massacres of Badr Khan
- Bab Ali demonstration
- Adana massacre
- Assyrian genocide
  - Massacres of Diyarbakır (1915)
- 1915 genocide in Diyarbekir
