= Faik Ali Ozansoy =

Turkish politician, poet, and educator

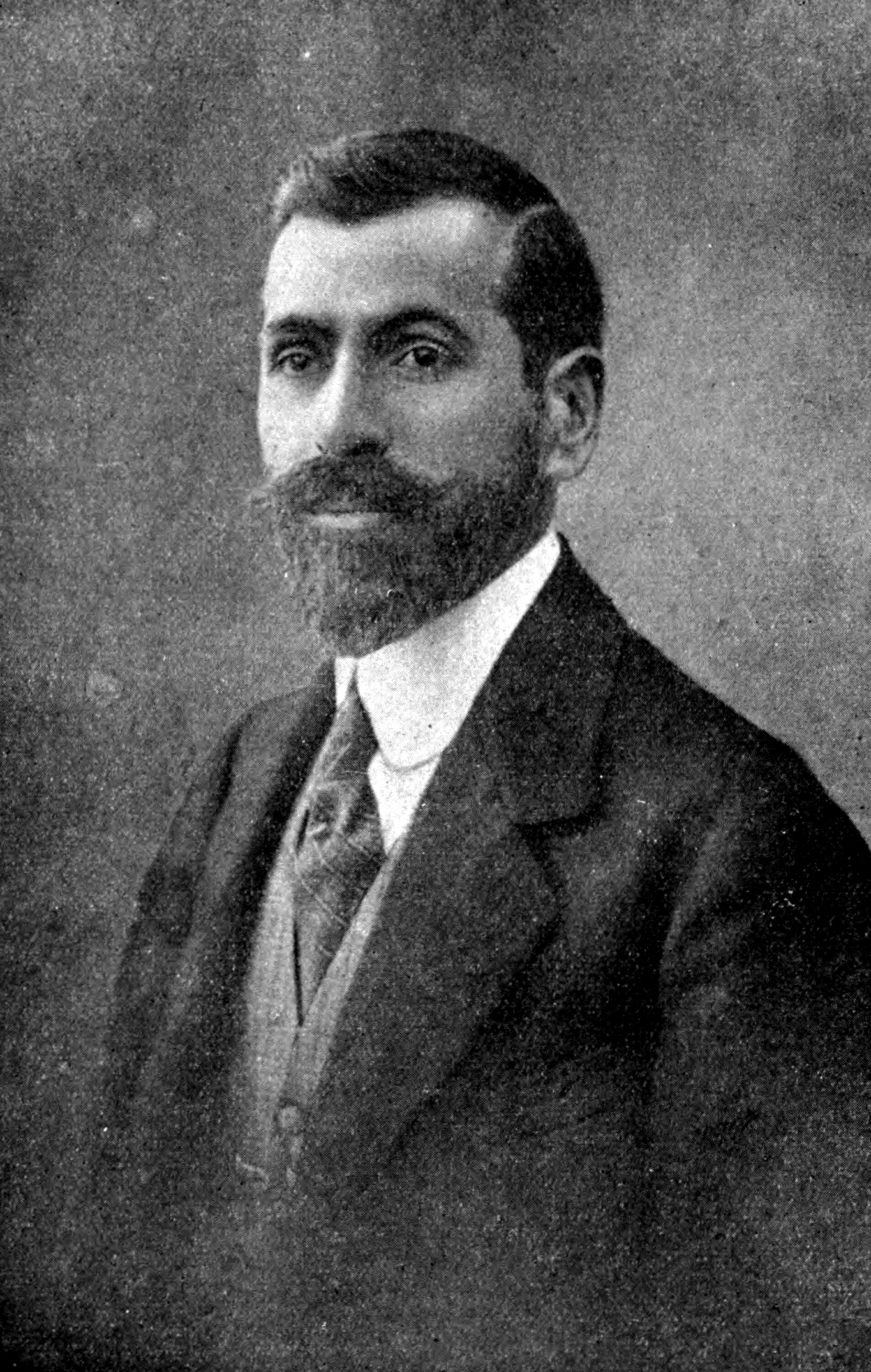

Personal details
- Born: 10 March 1876 Diyarbakır, Ottoman Empire
- Died: 1 October 1950 (aged 74) Ankara, Turkey

Faik Ali Ozansoy (10 March 1876 – 1 October 1950) was a Turkish politician, poet, and educator. He was the younger brother of Süleyman Nazif, an eminent man of letters and prominent member of the Committee for Union and Progress. Faik Ali was one of the foremost poets and writers of the Servet-i Fünun and Fecr-i Âti literary period. During World War I, Ozansoy served as the governor of Kütahya. Ozansoy is especially known for having saved the lives of thousands of Armenians during the Armenian genocide. Due to protecting the life of Armenian Christians, Ozansoy was known as the "governor of the infidels" by his contemporaries. On 24 April 2013, the day of remembrance for the Armenian Genocide, various prominent figures of both the Armenian and Turkish community visited his grave to pay tribute.

== Early life ==
Faik Ali Ozansoy, who was originally named Mehmet Faik, was born on 10 March 1876 in Diyarbakır, Ottoman Empire. He was born into a family that was known for their poetic skill. His father, Saîd Paşa, was a renowned historian of Diyarbakır. His father was of Kurdish origin belonging to the Zirqanid Tribe, while his mother, Ayşe Hanim, was a daughter of a prominent member of the Turkish Akkoyunlu tribe. Ozansoy had two sisters and a brother named Süleyman Nazif, who was a famous Turkish poet and politician.

== Armenian genocide ==
During the Armenian genocide, Ozansoy served as governor of the Kütahya Province. When orders of deportations reached Ozansoy, he refused to carry them out. His brother, Suleyman Nazif, insisted in a letter that he not "participate in this event, watch out for our family's honor." Meanwhile, while many Armenians were being deported through Kutahya and onto further destinations, Ozansoy protected them and provided shelter. He was then invited to Constantinople (now Istanbul) to explain his actions towards the Armenians. Memoirist Stepan Stepanian describes his encounter with Talaat Pasha :

Talaat asks him why he hasn't deported the Armenians of his town.

He answers that the Armenians of his sandjak have always been faithful Ottomans and that they have always lived with the Turks like brothers.

Talaat points out that the decision for deportations is for all Armenians and there can be no exception to this rule.
"In that case, since I don't want to be a murderer, please accept my resignation and find a successor who is willing to implement such a policy" says Ali Faik Bey.

Only then Talaat says, "Fine, fine. Take your Armenians and just sit in your place."

Faik Ali asked the Armenians, "why don't the Armenians open a school and serve their community that way?"
The Armenians replied, "because we don't know how long we will remain here due to the deportations."
"Oh, what's that supposed to mean?" he replied with a slight smile.
Two days later, he appealed to the religious council to have a school opened and assigned me as principal.

— Written in the memoirs of Stepan Stepanyan

While Ozansoy was in the capital negotiating with Talaat, the chief of police in Kutahya, Kemal Bey, took advantage of Ozansoy's absence and forced many Armenians in the province to convert to Islam. As a result, many of the Armenians converted to save themselves from deportation. Upon returning to Kutahya, Ozansoy was upset over the mass conversions. He immediately removed Kemal Bey from his post and reassessed the situation by asking the Armenians of Kutahya whether they wished to remain Muslim. All, with the exception of one, decided to stay Christian.

In the aftermath of the Armenian Genocide, Ozansoy refused a gift of gratitude from the Armenians consisting of 500 gold pieces and instead had the gold spent for the relief efforts of the Armenian refugees. The funds were used to establish a soup kitchen and a school. Ali Faik assigned Stepan Stepanyan as the first principal of the school.

== Later life ==
After World War I ended and with the establishment of the Republic of Turkey, Faik Ali Ozansoy continued working as a politician, then moved to Istanbul where he became the mayor of the Üsküdar and Beyoğlu districts in the city. During Damat Ferid Pasha's government, he was appointed as the undersecretary for the Ministry of Foreign Affairs. In March 1919, he served as a governor for the Diyarbakır Province for a few months. He returned to Istanbul where he became a French teacher at the Mulkiye Mektep School. He also wrote for the women's magazine Süs between 1923 and 1924. He served as an undersecretary for the Interior Ministry from 1930 to 1932.

He died on 1 October 1950 and is buried at the Zincirlikuyu Cemetery in Istanbul.

== Literary work and journalism ==
Some of Ozansoy's notable poems include:

- Fani Teselliler (1908)
- Temasil (1912)
- Elhan-ı Vatan (1915)

He was among the contributors of Mehâsin, a women's magazine which was started in the aftermath of the Young Turk Revolution in 1908.

== See also ==
- Witnesses and testimonies of the Armenian genocide
