= Hamid Bey =

Turkish politician

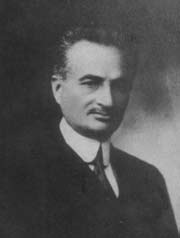
Hamid Bey

Hamid Bey (Kapancı) was the vali of Diyarbekir vilayet until his replacement by Mehmed Reshid on 25 March 1915.
