= Mehmed Reshid =

Ottoman politician and physician

- Mehmed Reşid
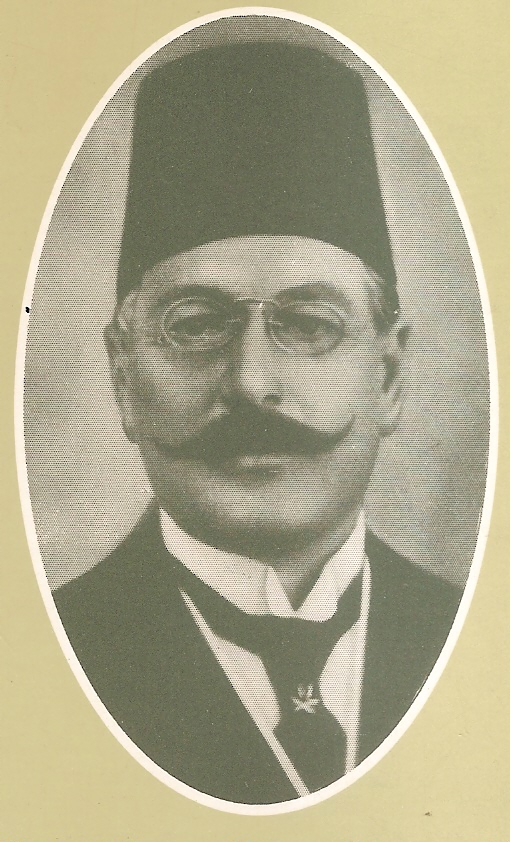

Governor of Diyarbekir
- In office 25 March 1915 – 1918?
- Preceded by: Hamid Bey
- Succeeded by: Office abolished

Personal details
- Born: 8 February 1873 Russian Empire
- Died: 6 February 1919 (aged 45) Allied-occupied Istanbul, Ottoman Empire
- Cause of death: Suicide by firearm
- Party: Committee of Union and Progress (CUP)
- Spouse: Mazlûme Hanım
- Education: Constantinople Military School of Medicine
- Profession: Doctor
- Known for: 1915 genocide in Diyarbekir

Mehmed Reshid (Turkish: Mehmed Reşid Şahingiray; 8 February 1873 – 6 February 1919) was an Ottoman politician and physician, official of the Committee of Union and Progress, and governor of the Diyarbekir Vilayet (province) of the Ottoman Empire during World War I. He is known for organizing the 1915 genocide of the Armenian and Assyrian communities of Diyarbekir, in which between 144,000 and 157,000 Armenians, Assyrians, and other Christians were killed. During the Allied occupation of Istanbul, Reshid was arrested and his roles in the massacres were exposed. He later escaped from prison, but committed suicide after being cornered by local authorities.

According to historian Hans-Lukas Kieser, despite being one of the worst perpetrators, Reshid "is perceived as a patriot and martyr in official Turkish-nationalist diction."

== Biography ==
Reshid was born on 8 February 1873 to a Tatar-Circassian family; due to increasing Russian persecution, he left with his family for the Ottoman Empire in 1874.

He enrolled in the Imperial Military School of Medicine at the capital, and was one of the founders of the Committee of Union and Progress (CUP). In 1894, Reshid was employed as an assistant to the German professor Düring Pasha at the Haydarpaşa hospital. In 1897 he was arrested by the police for his politics. He was tried in the Taşkışla Military Court and exiled to Tripoli in Libya with 77 others. There he served as a doctor in Tripoli until he returned to Constantiniople following the 1908 revolution.

When he returned to Constantinople and got promoted to Adjudant Major, he worked as a military doctor for some months but resigned from his position in the Ottoman military the following year on the 20 August 1909. He then pursued a career in state administration that on the 9 October 1909 took him as a Kaymakam to İstanköy (Kos) and in February 1910 he was promoted to Mutasarrıf in Homs, where he worked until his removal in June 1911. From Tripoli his career led him as a Mutasarrıf to Kozan, Lazistan and Karesi before he was named Vali of Diyarbekir on the 13 August 1914.

=== Diyarbekir governorship ===
Over the years, Reshid became increasingly radicalized and by 1914 he was convinced that the Christians of the empire were to blame for its economic woes. During his tenure as district governor of Karesi, he had organized the forced deportation of the Ottoman Greeks (Rumlar) in the Aegean, whom he no longer considered to be faithful citizens of the empire. This policy was supported by the Ottoman Interior Minister Talat Pasha.

In 1914, the Ottoman Empire entered World War I on the side of the Central Powers and fighting erupted at the border against Russia. In the spring of 1915, the Russians advanced into Ottoman territory and the quick march of their army toward Diyarbekir, according to historian Uğur Üngör, must have confirmed Reshid's "apocalyptic fear" of the Russians and their perceptions of all Armenians to be Russian spies. Before the war, the economic and political competition between the Muslim and Christian urban elite also played an important role in the violence.

His particularly strong hatred for the empire's Armenians was made manifest in the mass murders of Armenians and Assyrians he organized in the Diyarbekir province following his accession to the governorship on 25 March 1915, at the height of World War I. Reshid had persuaded himself that the native Armenian population was conspiring against the Ottoman state and he had accordingly drawn up plans for the "solution of the Armenian question." He recounted in his memoirs:

My appointment to Diyarbekir coincided with a very delicate period of the war. Large parts of Van and Bitlis had been invaded by the enemy [i.e., the Russians], deserters were transgressing, pillaging and robbing everywhere. Yezidi and Nestorian uprisings in or at the border of the province required the application of drastic measures. The transgressional, offensive and impudent attitude of the Armenians was seriously endangering the honor of the government.

Over the next two months the Armenians and Assyrians of the province were targeted in a brutal campaign of extermination and were wiped out by way of wholesale massacres and deportations. He established a "Committee of Inquiry" with the aim of the solution of the "Armenian Question". According to the Venezuelan officer and mercenary Rafael de Nogales, who visited the region in June 1915, Reshid had recently received a three-worded telegram from Talat Pasha to "Burn-Destroy-Kill," an order cited as official government approval of his persecution of the Christian population. He is said to have personally burned 800 Assyrian children alive after enclosing them in a building. Nesimi Bey and Sabit Bey, the governors of the districts of Lice and Sabit, respectively, are both suspected to have been assassinated under the express orders of Reshid for their opposition to the killings. Anywhere between 144,000 and 157,000 Armenians, Assyrians, and other Christians, or 87 to 95% of the province's Christian population, were killed or deported during Reshid's tenure as governor of Diyarbekir.

When later asked by the CUP secretary general Mithat Şukru Bleda how he, as a doctor, had had the heart to send so many people to death their deaths he replied:

"Being a doctor could not cause me to forget my nationality! Reshid is a doctor. But he was born as a Turk....Either the Armenians were to eliminate the Turks, or the Turks were to eliminate the Armenians. I did not hesitate when I was confronted with this dilemma. My Turkishness prevailed over my profession. I figured, instead of wiping us out, we will wipe them out....On the question how I, as a doctor, could have murdered, I can answer as follows: the Armenians had become hazardous microbes in the body of this country. Well, isn’t it a doctor’s duty to kill microbes?"

When asked by Bleda how history might remember him, Reshid simply responded, "Let other nations write about me whatever history they want, I couldn't care less."

=== Final years ===
Most of the jewellery and possessions Reshid had confiscated from the Armenians were, in theory, to be forwarded to the central government's treasury. Talat Pasha's concern for these valuables resulted in an investigation into Reshid for embezzlement, which found that he had amassed a personal fortune from the killings. A doctor, Hyacinth Fardjalian, attested, "I myself saw Rechid Bey arrive at Aleppo by a train bound for Constantinople with 43 boxes of jewellery and two cases of precious stones." He was transferred to Ankara province, where he assumed as the Vali between March 1916 and 1917. At this time he purchased a mansion on the Bosphorus with money stolen from murdered Armenians. When Talat found out about this, he had Reshid removed from his post. Süleyman Nazif commented, "Talat Pasha dismissed Reşit as a thief, while he adored him as murderer".

He then returned to Istanbul and began a business importing perfumes. On 5 November 1918, less than a week after Ottoman capitulation to the Allies, Reshid was arrested and sent to Bekirağa prison in Constantinople. His role in the massacres was exposed in the Constantinople press, albeit he would deny his actions and of ever having committed a crime. Reshid managed to escape from the prison in January 1919, but when government authorities cornered him, he committed suicide by shooting himself in the head. This caused a scandal as the people didn't think the government was taking the task of prosecuting war criminals seriously. Freedom and Accord Party supporters organized a large protest that marched to the Sublime Porte.

== Legacy ==
Despite his role in the destruction of the Christian communities of Diyarbekir, Reshid was embraced by the authorities of the newly established Republic of Turkey. In Ankara, a boulevard was named after him in his honour. The Ministry of Economy saw to it that his wife Mazlûme Hanım was properly cared for and in 1928 provided shops formerly belonging to deported Armenians to help support her livelihood. Reshid's family was also given two houses and, in a 1930 decree signed by President Mustafa Kemal and other members of the cabinet, was allocated further Armenian properties.

Even though he is now known as the "Butcher of Diyarbakir", Reshid claimed, during a conversation with Rafael de Nogales, to bear no legal or moral responsibility for the systematic massacre of Christians in his province, as he only followed orders from the Minister of the Interior, Talat Pasha. According to De Nogales, "Talat had ordered the slaughter by a circular telegram, if my memory is correct, containing a scant three words: Yak - Vur - Oldur, meaning, 'Burn, demolish, kill'. The authenticity of that terrible phrase was confirmed by the press of Constantinople after the Armistice with the publication of a certain telegram which the Ottoman commission engaged in investigating the massacres and deportations had discovered among the papers of the Committee of Union and Progress."

Süleyman Nazif, the former Vali of Mosul, had a very different opinion and testified after the Armistice, "The catastrophic deportations and murders in Diyarbekir were Reshid's work. He alone is responsible. He recruited people from the outside in order to perpetrate the killings. He murdered the Kaimakams in order to scare all other opposed Muslim men and women; he displayed the corpses of the Kaimakams in public."

== See also ==
- Philippe-Jacques Abraham
- Flavianus Michael Malke
- Leonard Melki
- Ignatius Maloyan
- Addai Sher

== Bibliography ==
- Akçam, Taner (2012), The Young Turks' Crime Against Humanity: The Armenian Genocide and Ethnic Cleansing in the Ottoman Empire, Princeton: Princeton University Press, ISBN 978-0-6911-5333-9.
- Gaunt, David (2006), "Death's End, 1915: The General Massacres of Christians in Diarbekir", in Richard G. Hovannisian (ed.), Armenian Tigranakert/Diarbekir and Edessa/Urfa, UCLA Armenian History and Culture Series: Historic Armenian Cities and Provinces, 6, Costa Mesa, CA: Mazda Publishers.
- Howard, Douglas A. (2017). A History of the Ottoman Empire. Cambridge University Press. ISBN 978-1108107471.
- Kieser, Hans-Lukas (2011). "From 'Patriotism' to Mass Murder: Dr. Mehmed Reşid (1873-1919)". A Question of Genocide: Armenians and Turks at the End of the Ottoman Empire. Oxford University Press. pp. 126–150. ISBN 978-0-19-979276-4.
- De Nogales, Rafael (1926), Four Years Beneath the Crescent, New York, London: C. Scribner's Sons.
- Üngör, Uğur (2005), CUP Rule in Diyarbekir Province, 1913-1923 (PDF), University of Amsterdam, Master's Thesis, archived from the original (PDF) on 2012-03-21.
- Üngör, Uğur (2011), The Making of Modern Turkey: Nation and State in Eastern Anatolia, 1913-1950, Oxford: Oxford University Press, ISBN 978-0-19-960360-2.
- Üngör, Uğur; Polatel, Mehmet (2011), Confiscation and Destruction: The Young Turk Seizure of Armenian Property, London: Continuum International.
