= Leonard Melki =

Roman Catholic priest

Blessed Leonard Melki OFMCap
- Fr. Leonard Melki in 1911

Martyr
- Born: 4 October 1881; B'abdāt, El Metn, Jabal Lubnān, Lebanon
- Died: 11 June 1915 (aged 33); Mardin, Ottoman Empire
- Venerated in: Roman Catholic Church, Eastern Catholic Churches
- Beatified: 4 June 2022, Couvent de la Croix, Bqennaya, Lebanon by Cardinal Marcello Semeraro
- Feast: 10 June
- Attributes: Capucchin habit

Leonard Melki (4 October 1881 – 11 June 1915) – born Yūsuf Habīb Melkī and in religion Līūnār of B'abdāt – was a Roman Catholic priest and a professed member of the Order of Friars Minor Capuchin. His name is often Romanized in various texts. Melki became a priest before serving as a preacher and teacher in different stations of the Mission of Armenia and Mesopotamia of the Capuchin Order. He eventually became the principal of the school of the Capuchin Order in Mardin where he taught the French language and music. He was later arrested and marched to the Sheikhan Caves in the deserts outside Mardin. On June 11, 1915, as part of a deportation convoy of Armenian and Assyrian Christians; including Catholics, Miaphysite Orthodox, and Protestants, they were massacred at the Sheikhan Caves by a combined force of the Ottoman Army and Ottoman Gendarmerie, during the Armenian and Assyrian Genocides ordered by Ottoman Interior Minister Talat Pasha.

Melki's cause for sainthood opened on 3 October 2005 – he was titled as a Servant of God. Pope Francis approved his beatification in 2020 but the COVID-19 pandemic halted the beatification plans; he was beatified on 4 June 2022.

== Life ==
Yūsuf Habīb Melkī was born on October 4, 1881, as the seventh of eleven children to Habīb Awaiss Melkī (1840–1906) and Noura Bou Moussi Kanaan Yammine (1845–1917). His siblings were: Daoud (b. 1870), Oueiss (b. 1873), Mariam (b. 1873), Kalim (1875–77), Kalimé (1875–1955), Mansoura (b. 1878), Youssfié (b. 1881), Khalil (1883–1959), Zayné (1890–1903) and Farés (1893–1967).

Yūsuf was baptized in the local Maronite parish church of Notre Dame on October 8, 1881, by the parish priest, Father Hanna Labaki, and his godfather was Assaad Raji Labaki. He attended the Notre Dame church near his home with his siblings. His father, who was known for his talented voice, aided the priest during Mass by singing hymns. Léonard and his brother Khalil both received their Confirmation at the same time on November 19, 1893, in the Latin Church and not in the Maronite Catholic Church. This is because some of the local villagers, including Léonard's family, left the Maronite Catholic Church and joined the Latin Catholic Church due to political, social, and economic reasons. At the time, the celebration of the First Communion was not yet instituted in the Latin Catholic Church.

Léonard received his early education, like all Christian Lebanese children at the time, under an oak tree in his home town of Baabdat. His school teacher was the Maronite priest Geries Yacoub Abi Hayla. Once some families in Baabdat joined the Latin Catholic Church, the Sacred Congregation for the Propagation of the Faith asked the Order of Friars Minor Capuchin to serve this newly established Latin parish. As a result of the Capuchin presence in Baabdat, Léonard became interested in joining their Order and consequently continued his education under them where he was sent to the San Stefano seminary near Istanbul in April, 1895.

He began his novitiate in 1899 and received the habit on July 1, 1899; he received his new religious name about a week later in honor of Saint Leonard of Port Maurice. He made his initial profession at Santo Stefano on July 2, 1900. Then he went to the major seminary in Budja where he received both the tonsure and the minor orders on February 10, 1901, before being made a deacon on July 24, 1904. Melkī was ordained to the priesthood on December 4, 1904.

Melkī passed a preaching exam on April 23, 1906, and was given the certificate of Apostolic Preacher the following month. He was destined to be sent on missions in the Ottoman Empire and began his mission in Mardin where he served as a teacher and preacher. He promoted the Third Order of Saint Francis in his apostolate and spread its evangelical and active apostolate in the places he worked in and encouraged others to receive it with an open mind – this sparked an increase in admittance numbers.

During 1910, he could not quite celebrate Mass too well due to his poor health which also brought bouts of headaches. He was sent to the Capuchin station in Mezere to rest since the climate there is better. Despite following his doctor's orders to rest, he did not get any better and requested time off to recuperate. He was allowed to go to Lebanon where he spent some months in 1911. He returned to the Capuchin station in Urfa on Christmas 1911 and stayed there until 1914 when he returned to Mardin.

Léonard was unjustly accused by the Ottoman government of conspiring to help the French government and was eventually arrested under false accusations on June 5, 1915. Léonard was threatened and was given an ultimatum - convert to Islam and be freed or die under Christianity. He chose the latter. Resultantly, he was tortured by the Turks in various ways from being beaten and pulled by the beard to being pushed down long staircases inside the fortress of Mardin where he was being detained. In addition to this, he was hung upside down from his feet for hours and experienced the painful torture of having his fingernails and toenails removed. After he spent one week being tortured in the fortress, Melkī along with hundreds of other Christian prisoners from Mardin were forced to walk kilometers outside the town towards the desert to be killed. Melkī was murdered on June 11, 1915.

== Beatification ==
The beatification process started in the initial phase after the forum for the beatification was transferred to Beirut from the Anatolia apostolic vicariate on August 30, 2005; he was titled as a Servant of God on October 3, 2005, under Pope Benedict XVI after the Congregation for the Causes of Saints issued the official "nihil obstat" to the cause.

The diocesan process opened on February 17, 2007, and later concluded its business on October 28, 2009, while a second process opened at some stage following this and later closed on December 15, 2011; the C.C.S. validated these processes in Rome on October 1, 2012, and received the two separate parts of the Positio dossier from the postulation in both 2014 and in 2015. The historians advising the C.C.S. approved unanimously the cause on February 28, 2017. Theologians advising the C.C.S. also approved the cause on November 19, 2019, while the cardinals and bishop members of the C.C.S provided their assent on October 6, 2020. Pope Francis provided his final assent and approved the beatification on October 27, 2020, which meant that Melki could be beatified. The beatification was instead on 4 June 2022. Since 2013, Carlo Calloni has served as postulator for this cause and is assisted by the Tony Haddad, OFMCap.
