= 1915 genocide in Diyarbekir =

Genocide of the Christian population of Diyarbakır in the Ottoman Empire

- Part of World War I
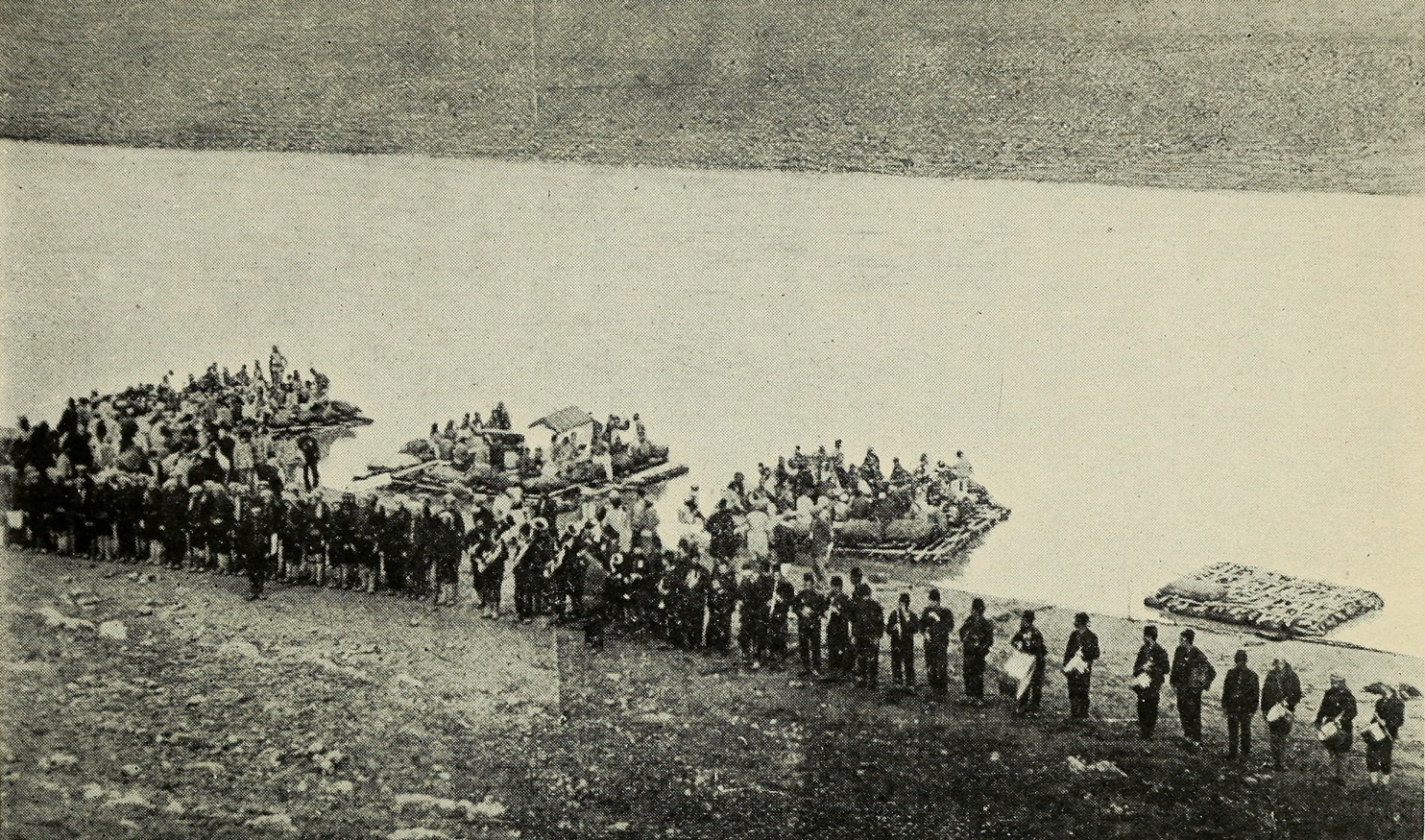
- Tigris river rafts, similar to those used to kill Christian notables from Diyarbekir in 1915
- Location: Diyarbekir, Ottoman Empire
- Date: 1915
- Target: Christians (vast majority of which Armenians and Assyrians)
- Attack type: Genocide, death march, and Islamization
- Perpetrator: Committee of Union and Progress

In 1915, a systematic anti-Christian genocide was committed by Ottoman authorities in Diyarbekir vilayet, claiming the lives of most Armenians and Syriac Christians living there. The genocide was ordered by governor Mehmed Reshid, partly with the backing of the ruling Committee of Union and Progress.

== Background ==
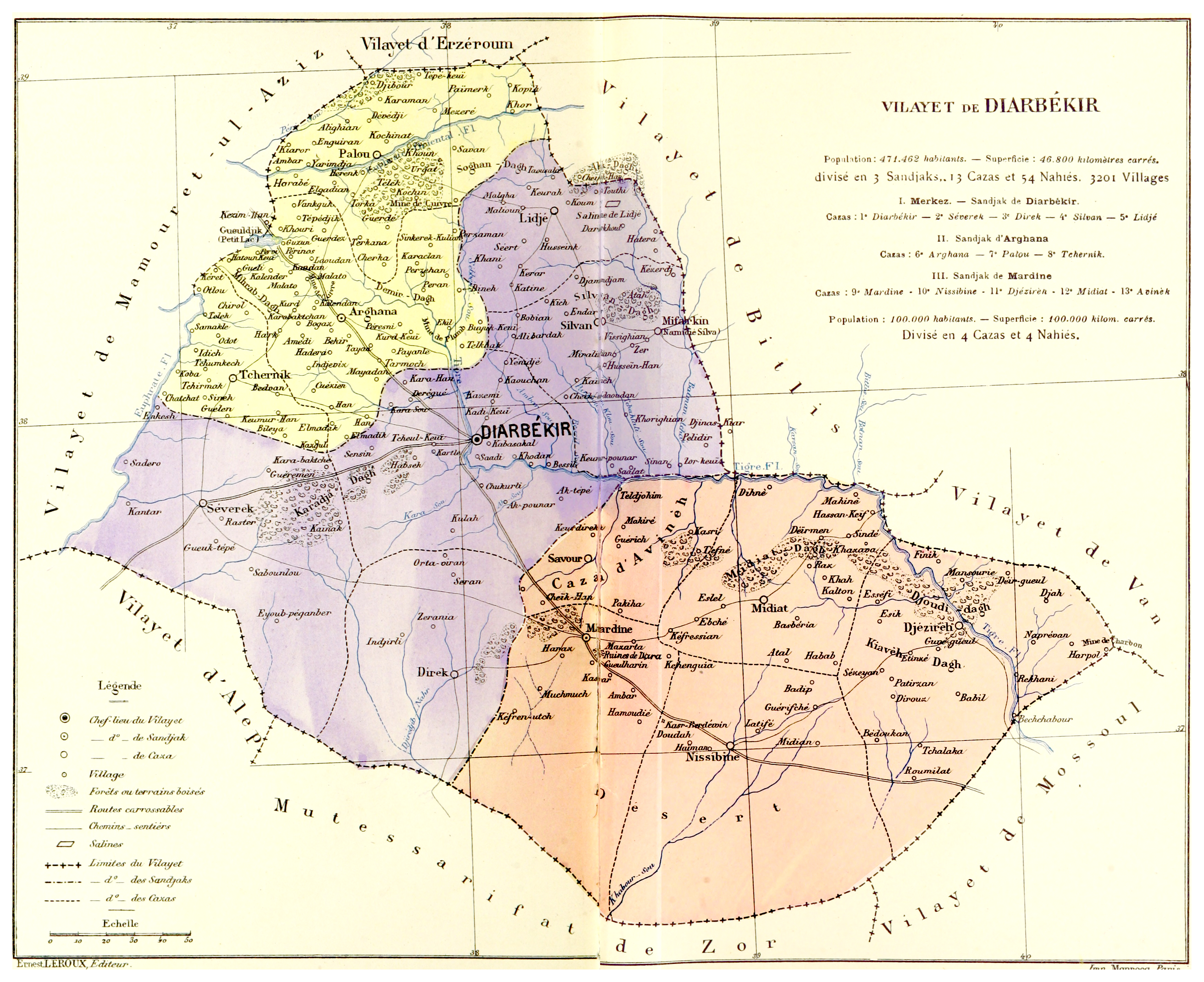
Diyarbekir vilayet showing sanjaks of Mardin (red), Diyarbekir (purple), and Arghana (yellow).

Diyarbekir vilayet, which had its capital in Diyarbekir, was bordered by the Euphrates (west), Tigris (east), the Armenian highlands (north), and the Syrian Desert (south). The area was ruled by the Ottoman Empire since 1534 and enjoyed prosperity based on its location along the Silk Road. The area was pre-industrial and most inhabitants were subsistence farmers or pastoralists.

The province was ethnically and religiously diverse. Ottoman Muslims dominated urban areas. Because of the millet system, the Ottoman Empire did not recognize ethnic groups, instead different religious denominations, organized as millets. The majority of Diyarbekir Armenians were farmers and inhabited 249 towns and villages concentrated in the north of the vilayet; they belonged to the Armenian Apostolic Church, Armenian Catholic Church, or were Protestant. The Armenian Patriarchate of Constantinople counted 106,867 adherents in Diyarbekir in its 1913/1914 census, although there were only 73,226 Armenians according to the 1914 Ottoman census. The Assyrians in Diyarbekir consisted of Syriac Orthodox Church, Syriac Catholic Church, Chaldean Catholic Church, Church of the East, and Protestants. Until the nineteenth century, these groups belonged to the Armenian millet.

Midyat was the only town in the Ottoman Empire with an Assyrian majority, although divided between Syriac Orthodox, Chaldeans, and Protestants. Syriac Orthodox Christians were concentrated in the hilly rural areas around Midyat, known as Tur Abdin, where they populated almost 100 villages and worked in agriculture or crafts. Syriac Orthodox culture was centered in two monasteries near Mardin, Mor Gabriel and Deyrulzafaran.

== Escalation ==
After August 1914, wartime requisitions proved an opportunity for implementing the CUP's national economy policy by conscripting economically active Armenians and confiscating property from them. On the night of 18/19 August 1914, the bazaar in Diyarbekir city was burned down by police chief Gevranlızâde Memduh Bey on the orders of Intibah Şirketi and Pirinççizâde Feyzi, ultimately orchestrated by the vali (governor) Mehmed Reshid. The police and gendarmerie made no effort to quench the flames and instead prevented shopkeepers from salvaging their wares. Altogether 1,578 shops and warehouses were destroyed, mostly owned by Armenians and Assyrians. The act being too outrageous for peacetime, Reshid was dismissed and his replacement as governor, Hamid Bey, dismissed Memduh but was unable to punish the other perpetrators of this arson.

In November 1914, a branch of the Special Organization was organized in Diyarbekir. The situation worsened over the winter of 1914–1915 as the Saint Ephraim church was vandalized and four young men from the Assyrian village of Qarabash were hanged on charges of desertion. Two were hanged in Diyarbekir city on 18 February, observed by Special Organization operative Ömer Naji and governor Hamid Bey. The day previously, Hamid had resigned or been forced to resign. Assyrian who gathered to protest the execution were clubbed by gendarmes and two died as a result. In March, many non-Muslim soldiers were disarmed and transferred to labor battalions where they were put to work building roads. Harsh conditions, mistreatment, and individual murders led to many deaths.

Hamid was initially to be replaced by Mustafa Bey, the governor of Bitlis, who accepted the position in late February. Due to pressure from local CUP circles, Mustafa was rejected in favor of Reshid who assumed the position on 25 March. Chosen for his previous record in perpetrating anti-Armenian violence, Reshid was one of the founding members of the CUP and a perpetrator of the 1914 Greek deportations. During his hiatus from leadership in Diyarbekir, Reshid held positions in Iraq during which he orchestrated several assassinations and built up a private army of a few dozen Circassians, who he brought with him to Diyarbekir upon his return. These were joined by convicts released from prison to serve in the Special Organization. Reshid organized a committee for the "solution of the Armenian question". On 6 April, following Talat's order, Reshid replaced the moderate mayor of Diyarbekir with Pirinççizâde Sıdkı, an anti-Armenian radical, and completed the stuffing of all key positions in the city with CUP stalwarts. Many local officials (kaymakams and mutesarrifs) refused to follow Reshid's orders and were replaced in May and June 1915. Kurdish confederations were pressured into allowing their Assyrian clients to be killed. Those allied with the government complied (including the Milli and Dekşuri), but those opposed to it—especially the Heverkan—sometimes resisted.

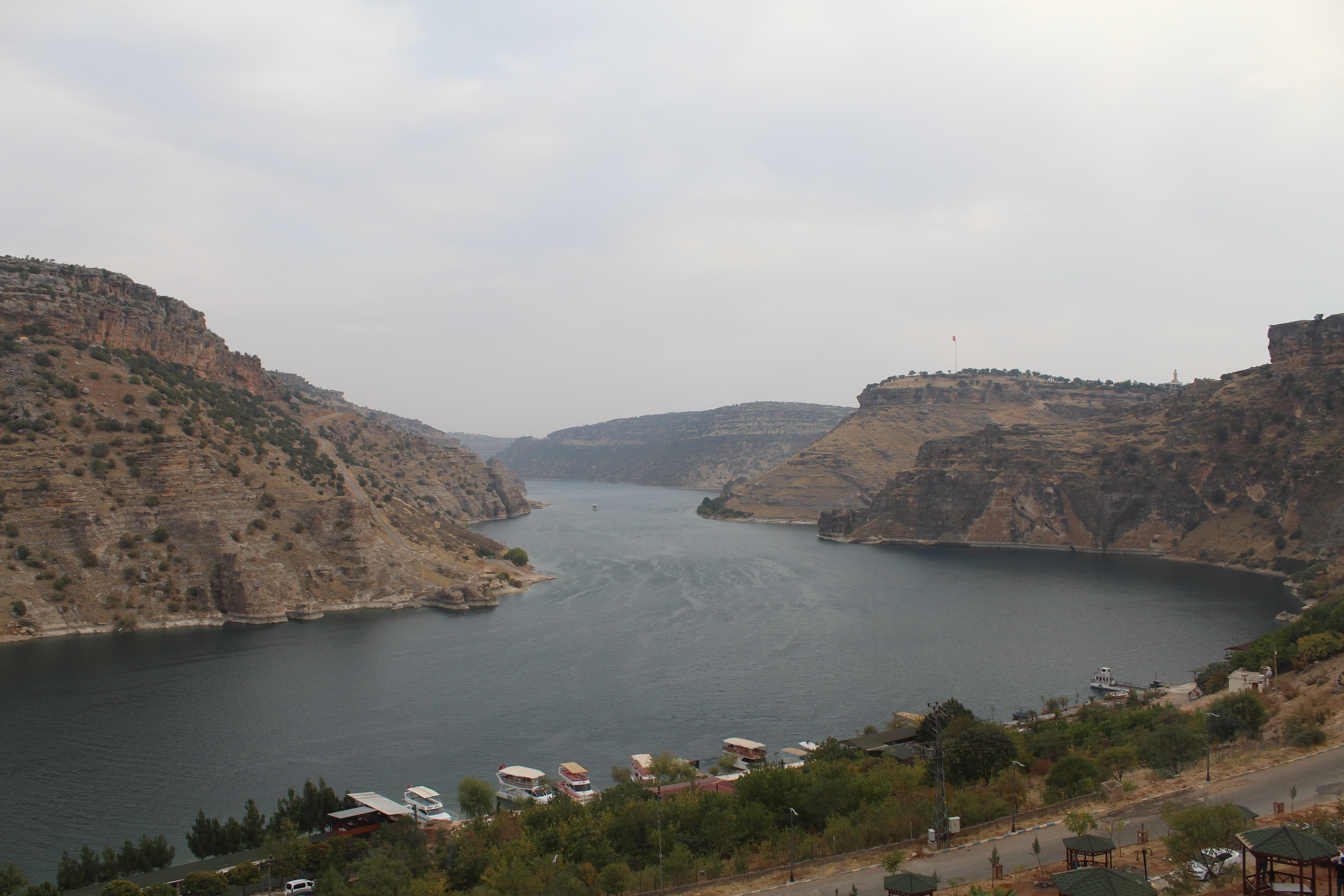
Tigris flowing through Eğil. In 1915, many Christian men were killed by drowning in the river.

Although both Christians and Muslims deserted in large numbers, in his memoirs Reshid emphasized the threat of Armenian deserters, who he imagined were conspiring in revolutionary action. Reshid did not distinguish between Armenians who were guilty or innocent of anti-state activity. On 1 April, Reshid launched a major operation against desertion in Diyarbekir and demanded the surrender of all arms. Warrantless searches through Armenian districts—accompanied by "extremely violent incidents", such as rapes—escalated into arbitrary arrest of Armenian men throughout Diyarbekir city. Two weeks later, more than 600 Armenian artisans and notables were under arrest, where they were tortured to extract information about arms caches. Unsatisfied, he requested reinforcements from Constantinople to supplement the available strength of 300 police and gendarmes. These requests were refused, pushing Reshid to increasingly radical action.

On 20 April, Armenians from all religious denominations and the Dashnak, Hnchak, and Ramgavar parties met to discuss a proposal for self-defense. Ultimately this proposal was rejected because of the insufficient weaponry at their disposal to hold out.

== Propaganda ==
After the search and seizure of weapons photographs were taken for propaganda purposes. The resulting pictures were described by eyewitness Rafael de Nogales as "composed almost entirely of fowling-pieces easily disguised" with no other aim than to "impress the public". In another case, Armenian deportees were massacred in Kozandere (an hour south of Diyarbekir) and dressed in turbans and Muslim clothing. These photographs were claimed to be of Muslims massacred by Armenian "insurgents", in order to stir up anti-Armenian sentiment.

== Responsibility ==
Under Reshid's leadership, a systematic anti-Christian extermination took place in Diyarbekir vilayet. All contemporary observers attributed these massacres to Reshid personally. Although the genocide began in April 1915, there were no orders, even for the persecution of Armenians, until the end of June. During this crucial period, all actions were taken on Reshid's authority. Historian Uğur Ümit Üngör states that, in Diyarbekir, "most instances of massacre in which the militia engaged were directly ordered by" Reshid. In September 1915, Reshid reported the deportation of 120,000 "Armenians" from the vilayet, exceeding their prewar population.

On 12 July 1915, Talat telegraphed Reshid, ordering that "measures adopted against the Armenians are absolutely not to be extended to other Christians ... you are ordered to put an immediate end to these acts". No action was taken against Reshid for exterminating non-Armenian Christians, or even assassinating Ottoman officials who disagreed with the massacres, and in 1916 he was rewarded by appointment as governor of Ankara. As a consequence, it is debatable whether Talat's telegram was sent to appease German and Austrian opposition to the massacres and not intended to be implemented. Historian Raymond Kévorkian argues that the genocide of Assyrian Christians in Diyarbekir was likely ordered by the CUP Central Committee.

In November 1918, during the occupation of Istanbul, Reshid was arrested and his roles in the massacres were exposed. He later escaped from prison in January 1919, but committed suicide after being cornered by local authorities the following month.

== Death toll ==
According Rhétoré's estimates, Syriac Orthodox in Diyarbekir lost 72 percent of their population, compared to 92 percent of Armenian Catholics and 97 percent of Armenian Apostolic Church adherents. In Mardin sanjak the Syriac Orthodox lost 57 percent. According to Gaunt, "These figures indicate that although the eradication of the Assyrian population was extreme, it was still not as total as for the Armenians." According to Üngör, "all Christian communities of Diyarbekir were equally hit by the genocide, although the Armenians were often particularly singled out for immediate destruction".

Christian population in Diyarbekir vilayet in 1915–1916 according to Jacques Rhétoré
Denomination	Prewar population	Postwar population	Disappeared
Armenian Apostolic Church	60,000	2,000	58,000 (97%)
Armenian Catholic Church	12,500	1,000	11,500 (92%)
Chaldean Catholic Church	11,120	1,110	10,010 (90%)
Syriac Catholic Church	5,600	2,150	3,450 (62%)
Syriac Orthodox Church	84,725	24,000	60,725 (72%)
Protestantism	725	225	500 (69%)
Total	174,670	30,485	144,185 (83%)

The few Greeks, Orthodox or Catholic, living in Diyarbekir weren't spared either. 425 out of 583 Greeks in the Silvan district (79 percent) were killed, including the Greek Orthodox priest of Diyarbekir.

== See also ==
- List of massacres in Turkey
- Late Ottoman genocides
- List of genocides

== Sources ==
- Gaunt, David (2006). Massacres, Resistance, Protectors: Muslim-Christian Relations in Eastern Anatolia During World War I. Gorgias Press. ISBN 978-1-59333-301-0.
- Gaunt, David (2012). "Relations between Kurds and Syriacs and Assyrians in Late Ottoman Diyarbekir". Social Relations in Ottoman Diyarbekir, 1870-1915. Brill. pp. 241–266. ISBN 978-90-04-23227-3.
- Gaunt, David (2013). "Failed Identity and the Assyrian Genocide". Shatterzone of Empires: Coexistence and Violence in the German, Habsburg, Russian, and Ottoman Borderlands (illustrated ed.). Indiana University Press. ISBN 978-0-253-00631-8.
- Gaunt, David (2015). "The Complexity of the Assyrian Genocide". Genocide Studies International. 9 (1): 83–103. doi:10.3138/gsi.9.1.05. ISSN 2291-1847.
- Gaunt, David (2017). "Sayfo Genocide: The Culmination of an Anatolian Culture of Violence". Let Them Not Return: Sayfo - The Genocide Against the Assyrian, Syriac, and Chaldean Christians in the Ottoman Empire. Berghahn Books. pp. 54–69. ISBN 978-1-78533-499-3.
- Kévorkian, Raymond (2011). The Armenian Genocide: A Complete History. Bloomsbury Publishing. ISBN 978-0-85771-930-0.
- Üngör, Uğur Ümit (2011). The Making of Modern Turkey: Nation and State in Eastern Anatolia, 1913–1950. Oxford University Press. ISBN 978-0-19-965522-9.
- Üngör, Uğur Ümit (2017). "How Armenian was the 1915 Genocide?". Let Them Not Return: Sayfo - The Genocide Against the Assyrian, Syriac, and Chaldean Christians in the Ottoman Empire. Berghahn Books. pp. 33–53. ISBN 978-1-78533-499-3.
- Suny, Ronald Grigor (2015). "They Can Live in the Desert but Nowhere Else": A History of the Armenian Genocide. Princeton University Press. ISBN 978-1-4008-6558-1.
