= Ottoman Gendarmerie =

National Gendarmerie force of the Ottoman Empire

The Ottoman Gendarmerie (Turkish: Jandarma), also known as zaptiye or subaşı, was a security force and public order organization (a precursor to law enforcement) in the 19th-century Ottoman Empire. The first official gendarmerie organization was founded in 1869.

== History ==
After the abolition of the Janissary corps of the Ottoman Empire in 1826, military organizations called Asâkir-i Muntazâma-i Mansûre, Asâkir-i Muntazâma-i Hâssa, and, in 1834, Asâkir-i Redîfe were established to deliver security and public order services in Anatolia and in some provinces of Rumelia.

Since the term Gendarmerie was noticed only in the Assignment Decrees published in the years following the declaration of Tanzimat in 1839, it is assumed that the Gendarmerie organization was founded after that year, but the exact date of foundation has not yet been determined. Therefore, taking the June 14 of "June 14, 1869", on which Asâkir-i Zaptiye Nizâmnâmesi was adopted, June 14, 1839 was accepted as the foundation date of the Turkish Gendarmerie.

After 1877–1878 Russo-Turkish War, Ottoman prime minister Mehmed Said Pasha decided to bring some officers from Britain and France to establish a modern law enforcement organization. After the Young Turk Revolution in 1908, the Gendarmerie achieved great successes, particularly in Rumelia. In 1909, the Gendarmerie was affiliated with the Ministry of War, and its name was changed to the Gendarmerie General Command (Ottoman Turkish: Umûm Jandarma Kumandanlığı).

Gendarmerie units both sustained their internal security duties and took part in the national defence at various fronts as a part of the Armed Forces during the World War I and the Turkish War of Independence.
