= Diyarbekir vilayet =

First-level administrative division of the Ottoman Empire

Coordinates: 37°54′36″N 40°14′24″E

ولايت دياربكر Vilâyet-i Diyâr-ı Bekr
- Vilayet of the Ottoman Empire
- 1867–1922
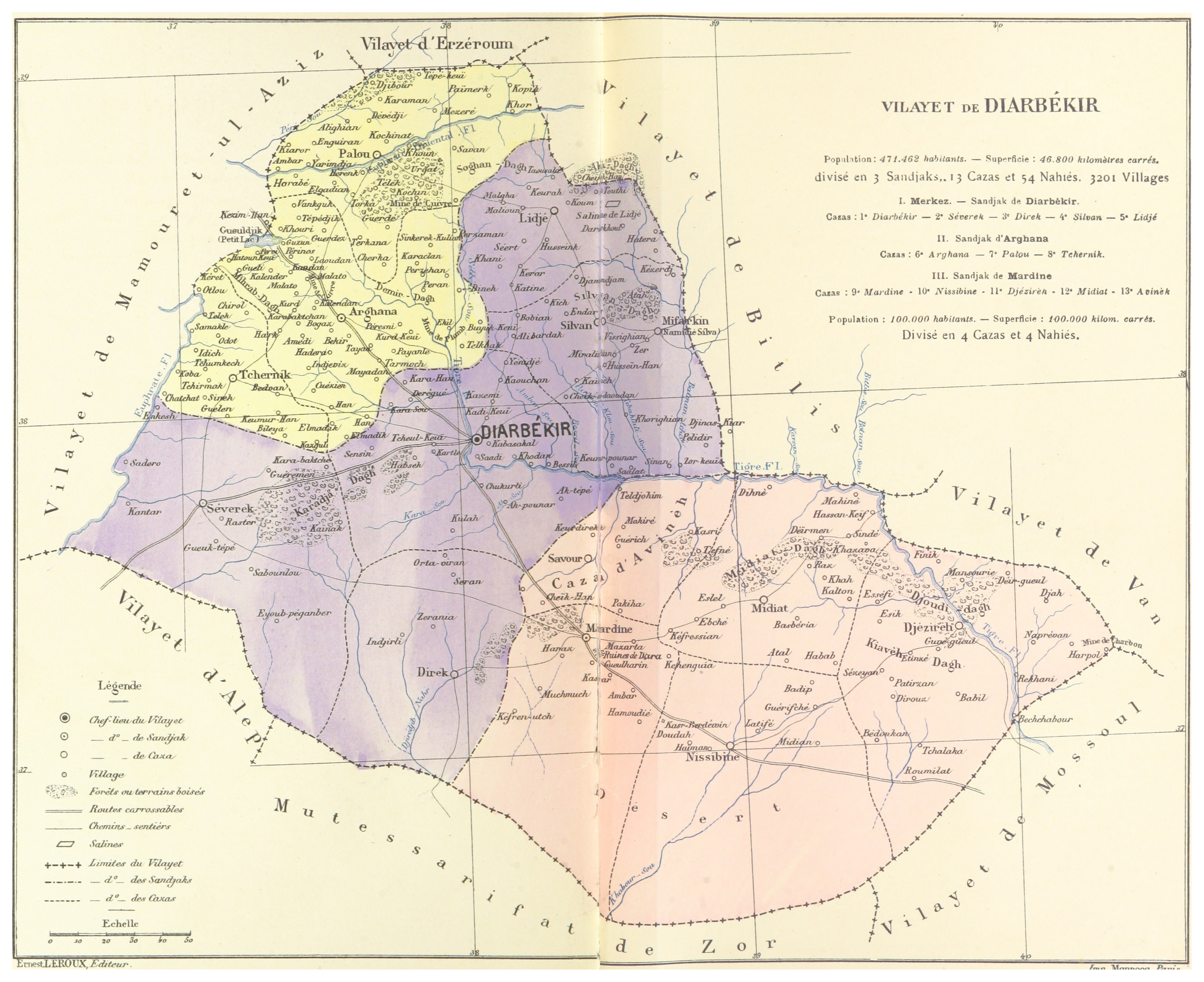
- The Diyâr-ı Bekr Vilayet in 1892
- Capital: Diyarbekir
- History
  - Vilayet Law: 1867
  - Disestablished: 1922
Preceded by	Succeeded by
Kurdistan Eyalet	Diyarbakir Province
- Today part of: Turkey; Syria

The Vilayet of Diyâr-ı Bekr (Armenian: Տիգրանակերտի նահանգ, Ottoman Turkish: ولايت دياربكر, Vilâyet-i Diyarbakır) was a first-level administrative division (vilayet) of the Ottoman Empire, wholly located within what is now modern Turkey. The vilayet extended south from Palu on the Euphrates to Mardin and Nusaybin on the edge of the Mesopotamian plain. After the establishment of Republic of Turkey in 1923, the region was incorporated into the newly created state.

At the beginning of the 20th century, Diyarbekir Vilayet reportedly had an area of 18,074 square miles (46,810 km^{2}), while the preliminary results of the first Ottoman census of 1885 (published in 1908) gave the population as 471,462. The accuracy of the population figures ranges from "approximate" to "merely conjectural" depending on the region from which they were gathered.

== History ==
The Vilayet of Diyarbakir was created in 1867. In 1867 or 1868 Mamuret-ul-Aziz and the Kurdistan Eyalet merged with and joined the Vilayet of Diyarbakir. In 1879–80 Mamuret-ul-Aziz was separated again from the Vilayet of Diyarbakir, and turned into the Vilayet of Mamuret-ul-Aziz. It was one of the six Armenian Vilayets of the Empire.

== Administrative divisions ==
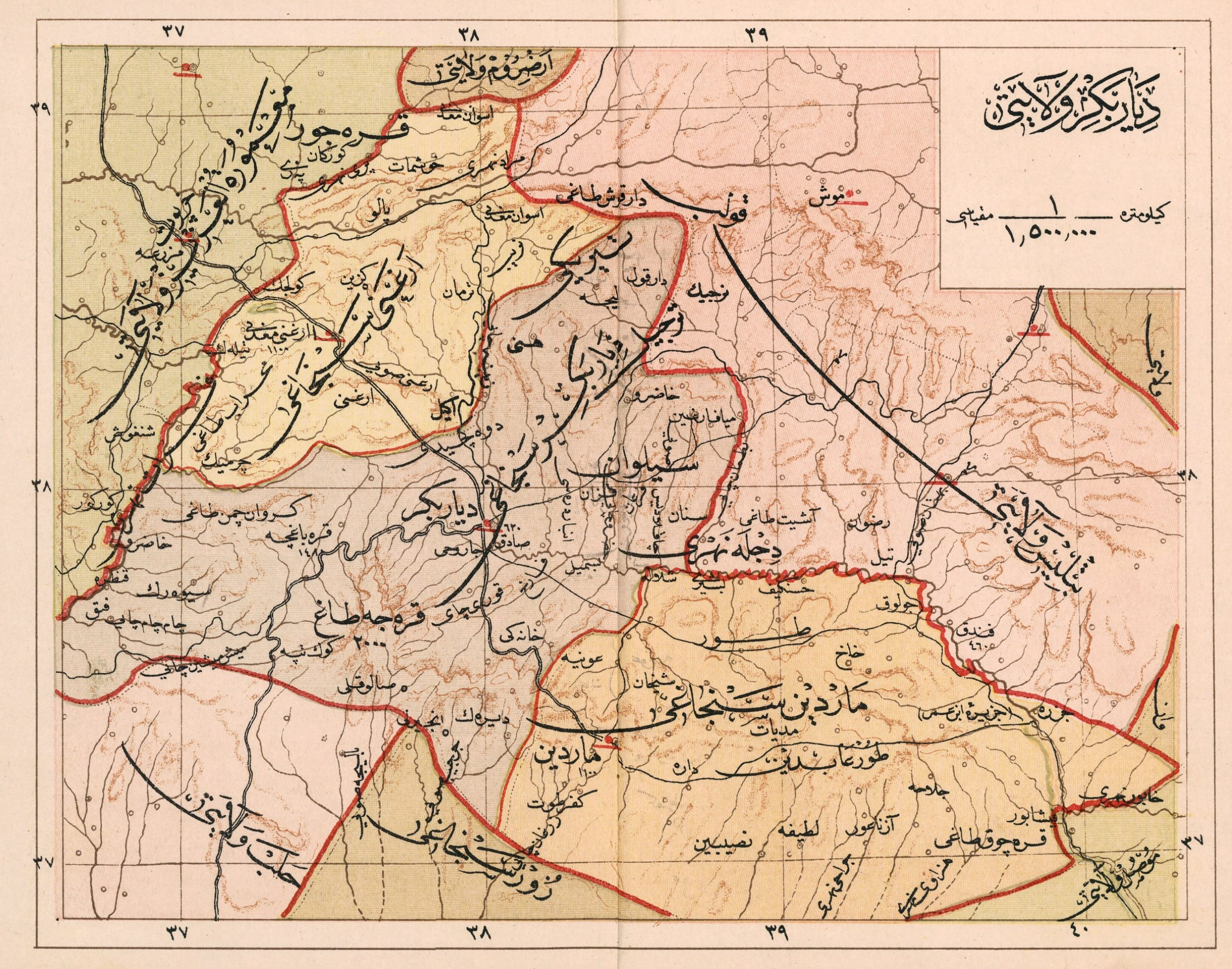
Map of subdivisions of Diyarbekir Vilayet in 1907

Sanjaks of the vilayet:

1. Diyarbekir Sanjak (Diyarbakır, Lice, Silvan, Derik, Beşiri)
2. Mardin Sanjak (Mardin, Cizre, Midyat, Savur, Nusaybin and maybe Silopi)
3. Ergani Sanjak (Maden, Palu)
4. Siverek Sanjak (Split from Diyarbekir in 1907) (Siverek, Çermik, Viranşehir)

== Demographics ==
The Vilayet was a place in which the Christian population was systematically massacred during World War I during the 1915 genocide in Diyarbekir.

Christian population in Diyarbekir vilayet in 1915–1916 according to Jacques Rhétoré
Denomination	Prewar population	Postwar population	Disappeared
Armenian Apostolic Church	60,000	2,000	58,000 (97%)
Armenian Catholic Church	12,500	1,000	11,500 (92%)
Chaldean Catholic Church	11,120	1,110	10,010 (90%)
Syriac Catholic Church	5,600	2,150	3,450 (62%)
Syriac Orthodox Church	84,725	24,000	60,725 (72%)
Protestantism	725	225	500 (69%)
Total	174,670	30,485	144,185 (83%)

== See also ==
- Massacres of Diyarbakır (1895)
- 1915 genocide in Diyarbekir
- Six Vilayets
