= Defence of Iwardo =

1915 defence of the village of Iwardo during the Assyrian genocide

- Part of the Assyrian genocide
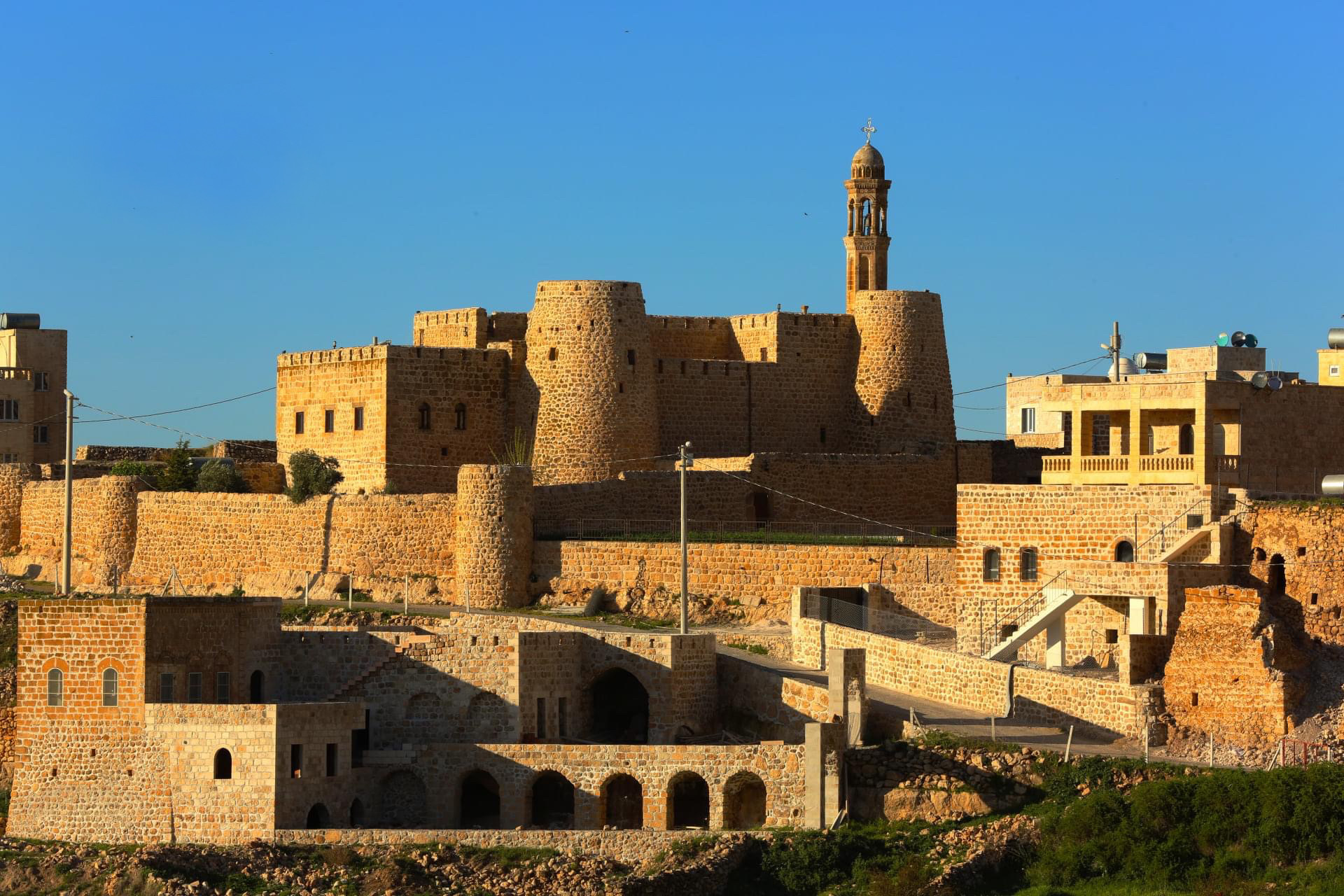
- The Mor Hadbschabo Church in Iwardo, where Assyrians took shelter during the defence
Date	July – October 1915
Location	Iwardo, Tur Abdin (present-day Gülgöze, Mardin)
Result	Assyrian victory

Belligerents
(Assyrian homeland) Assyrian villagers and refugees	Ottoman Empire: Allied Kurdish tribes

Commanders and leaders
(Assyrian homeland) Gallo Shabo (Assyrian homeland) Ma'sud Miraza	(Ottoman Empire) Ahmed Agha (Ottoman Empire) Salem Agha

Strength
(Assyrian homeland) 700–1,000 fighters (estimated)	(Ottoman Empire) 13,000

The defence of Iwardo (Syriac: ܥܝܢ ܘܪܕܐ, romanized: Ayn Wardo) was a military engagement between Ottoman authorities and Assyrian defenders in 1915, during the events of the Assyrian genocide. The defence of Iwardo is coupled with the defence of Azakh, which also took place around the same time.

Like that of Azakh, the story of the defence of Iwardo remains significant to the memory of the Assyrian genocide. Survivors have testified about the events during and after the defence, and it is one of the only successful episodes of Assyrian resistance to the genocide.

== Background ==
The village of Iwardo (modern day Gülgöze) is located 10 kilometres (6.2 mi) east of Midyat at the foot of a mountain chain. Prior to the start of World War I, the village had about 200 families, all of whom were Assyrians belonging to the Syriac Orthodox Church. During the Assyrian genocide, thousands of refugees from throughout Tur Abdin arrived there for safety as the structure and topography of the village allowed for considerable defence from the ensuing violence. Up to that point, Assyrians in the Tur Abdin region had engaged in defences against the massacres, but the Ottoman authorities portrayed this as a rebellion in hopes of justifying the genocide. Iwardo was one of the only villages in the region of Midyat that still held out against Ottoman and Kurdish soldiers, similarly to Azakh. Refugees arrived from villages including Habasnos, Midyat, Bote, Keferze, Kafro Eloyto, Mzizah and Urnas, and they would typically arrive through tunnels that were kept secret from Ottoman officials. (Note: These tunnels were called "khishe" in Surayt) According to the International Raoul Wallenberg Foundation, some Armenians had also taken refuge in Iwardo during this time.

Iwardo was believed to have had up to 6–7,000 Assyrians inside of the village as news spread of Kurdish and Ottoman forces planning attacks. They took shelter at the Mor Hadbschabo Church, a structure built centuries prior that had a large fortress-like architecture. Once within the walls of Ayn-Wardo, the refugees were given water and food (of which the village was rich in), and then assigned to defensive duties. They had reinforced the walls around the village for the upcoming defence. In the meanwhile, Mas'ud Miraza, a local Assyrian leader, gathered 700–1,000 men and began strategizing a defence against the Kurds. He gathered weapons from Yazidis and information from Armenian and Assyrian survivors who were rescued from neighboring villages.

Aware that Ottoman Turks, Kurds, and Mhallami were coming to Iwardo, the villagers and refugees created a militia to defend themselves, which was led by Gallo Shabo. Shabo was born in 1875 in the village and received education in ecclesiastical doctrines, leading to his appointment as deacon in the Syriac Orthodox Church of the village. At the same time, the Kurdish leadership of Midyat, Azizke Mahmado, gave orders to attack Iwardo and Enhil. However, Aziz Agha, the leader of the Midyat area, reported that they didn't have enough soldiers to attack both areas, and therefore they would attack Iwardo only. Therefore, the Kurds of Tur Abdin and Ramman, under the generalship of Ahmed Agha and Salem Agha, gathered a force of 13,000 men in Mardin. The government authorized the distribution of arms and paid the men who were part of the forces. Kurdish and Ottoman forces began arriving to Iwardo starting in the middle of July.

== Preparations and defence ==
In preparing for the defence, the Assyrians of Iwardo melted iron and other materials that could be utilized for producing ammunition, as well as cutting trees and gathering other supplies they could use. Testimonies post that those who participated in the defence learned how to manufacture gunpower and bullets, the latter being manufactured from copper and lead. Additionally, Miraza restored walls to strengthen Iwardo's defence and sent men not involved in the defence to stage counterattacks to create confusion among the Ottoman forces. Women also played a role in the defence, calling out helholo ululations and hawara cries when signs of invasion were imminent, and keeping watch over the village.

According to Shabo, more than twelve thousand Muslim fighters surrounded Iwardo and began to attack. In testimonies after the defence, after Kurds began attacking the Mor Hadbschabo Church, Miraza yelled:

Woe has come to you, people of Midyat! Woe has come you, people of Mzizah! Woe has come to you, people of Iwardo! Heaven has come to [our] doorstep! Rise and attack! Let the women shout out loud their joyfulness and let the men fight!

At the same token, Bishop Abdlahad, who took refuge in the Mor Hadbschabo Church, was given a sign of victory by the fighters, and used religious language to interpret the victory of the defence.

In the first period of the defence, a counterattack was staged against the 13,000 strong force to split the enemy, even resulting in the seizure of their battle flag. Assyrians had to withstand being in the crossfire of shooting from different sides, including Ottoman Turkish forces, Kurds, and gendarmes. Some villagers had experience from serving in the Ottoman military, and during one assault, they were able to inflict 50 Turkish casualties, including a high-ranking officer. In total, 200 attackers and 300 villagers were killed. Afterwards, the Ottomans prepared to negotiate an armistice through the Shiekh of Dara, promising protection to the villagers if they gave up their arms and obeyed government orders. When villagers refused, a three-day battle began, but was unsuccessful. Before the beginning of a third attempt, Kurdish leaders called for aid from the mayors of Diyarbakır (Raschid) and Mardin (Badri), and sent two Syriac Orthodox priests in an attempt to convince the defenders to surrender their weapons. An Assyrian delegation met with Aziz to discuss a peace treaty, but refused to lay down their weapons, so the battle continued. The siege continued for another 30 days, leading to many casualties on both sides.

In the end, the Kurdish soldiers retreated and left the Assyrians of Tur Abdin alone. They announced a negotiator of their own while the Assyrians requested one as well (Sheikh Fethullah, who was Mhallami), and so the people of Iwardo were promised they would not be harmed. They successfully resisted for 52 days (Note: Other sources have disputed the length of the siege as being around 60 days) and ended in success. The total death toll of the siege is unknown, but it was at least 1,000. By the end of the defence, many women and children had starved to death and food supplies began to run low.

== Aftermath ==
The number of those who were killed returning to their villages ended up being greater than those who were killed during the defence. Although promises of amnesty were made to those who relinquished their weapons, those who did found themselves massacred. The account of the defence written by Ishak Armalé, a Syriac Catholic priest, was later presented at the 1922–1923 Lausanne Conference to punish crimes of massacre. Gallo Shabo fled to Mosul in 1920 to live with his uncles, before leaving Iraq for Qamishli three years later. It is said that he was one of twenty families in Gozarto to own agricultural property. He lived there until his death in 1966.

Due to the efforts of the defence, nearly 6–7,000 Assyrians were able to survive the Ottoman and Kurdish attacks on the village. Although other battles and fighting took place in Tur Abdin (Benabil (Bulbul), Beth-Debe, Hah, Hebob, Kerboran (Dergecit), and Zaz), the strongest stand was in Azakh, Iwardo, and Basibrin. In modern studies of Sayfo, the defence of Iwardo is discussed alongside the defence of Azakh as part of the stands of defence that Assyrians took during the genocide; today, the village has become famous for being one of those stands. Due to the successful efforts to defend the village, Iwardo has since become a marker of Syriac Christianity in southeastern Turkey, and is why the Tur Abdin region is one of the only major Christian areas left in Turkey outside of Istanbul. In 2018, Hannibal Travis, a lawyer and genocide scholar, explained that the defence of Iwardo was similar to that of the Armenian's defence of Van and Musa Dagh. Additionally, the role of Sheikh Fatullah in negotiations during the defence is cited as a positive example of relations with the Mhallami by Assyrian activists.

== Legacy ==
The memories of the resistance and the gaboro (Syriac: ܓܢܒܪ̈ܐ, lit. 'heroes') of Iwardo are recounted in Assyrian news sources such as Suroyo TV and a book published by Xalaf Bar-Dawud. Mor Julius Yeshu Cicek, who was the first Syriac Orthodox archbishop for Central Europe, published a poem that was written by Gallo Shabo after the defence, which details its events and theological reasoning behind why the Assyrians had to suffer from the Ottoman and Kurdish soldiers. In 1986, an interview with a witness and survivor of the Assyrian genocide, Yusëf Hanna, provided testimony to the defence of Iwardo and his experiences. The interview was later translated by the Assyrian Student Association of Chicago. In Assyrian genocide denial literature, Turkish professor Bülent Özdemir states that the story of the defence of Iwardo is "transmitted in an exaggerated way".

Similarly to the defence of Azakh, music has been produced by Assyrian artists referencing the gabore of the defence of Iwardo. In 2018, Jacob Dinc published the song "M'Qadashto Hat Iwardo", addressed to the village in the second-person. Towards the end, he characterizes Iwardo as the home of heroes, expressing pain and agony in a retelling of the oral history of the Assyrian genocide. Assyrian singer Ishok Yakub composed a similar song with the lyrics:

Do not let my remains be scattered and stepped on, in this land.... Take my corpse to the village of Iwardo. Put me between the martyrs that are buried in the church of Mor-Hodtschabo.

== Bibliography ==
- Akdemir, Mary (31 January 2023). "Big Secrets, Small Villages: The Collective Memory of the Assyrian Genocide". In Akçam, Taner; Kyriakidis, Theodosios; Chatzikyriakidis, Kyriakos (eds.). The Genocide of the Christian Populations in the Ottoman Empire and its Aftermath (1908-1923) (1st ed.). London: Routledge. doi:10.4324/9781003207221. ISBN 9781003207221.
- Atto, Naures (2011). Hostages in the Homeland, Orphans in the Diaspora: Identity Discourses Among the Assyrian/Syriac Elites in the European Diaspora (PDF). Leiden University Press.
- Dolbee, Samuel (25 May 2023). Locusts of Power: Borders, Empire, and Environment in the Modern Middle East. Cambridge University Press. ISBN 9781009200318.
- Gaunt, David (2006). Massacres, Resistance, Protectors: Muslim-Christian Relations in Eastern Anatolia During World War I. Berghahn Books. ISBN 978-1-78533-499-3.
- Gaunt, David; Atto, Naures; Barthoma, Soner O. (May 1, 2017). Let Them Not Return: Sayfo – The Genocide Against the Assyrian, Syriac, and Chaldean Christians in the Ottoman Empire (PDF). Berghahn Books. ISBN 978-1-78533-499-3.
- Gaunt, David (November 1, 2020). "The Long Assyrian Genocide". In Astourian, Stephan; Kévorkian, Raymond (eds.). Collective and State Violence in Turkey: The Construction of a National Identity from Empire to Nation-State. Berghahn Books. p. 85. ISBN 978-1-78920-451-3.
- Gerçek, Burçin (24 April 2014). Report on Turks who reached-out to Armenians in 1915 (PDF) (Report). International Raoul Wallenberg Foundation.
- Lingius, Lars Hillås (2015). "In Times of Genocide, 1915-2015: report from a conference on the Armenian Genocide and Syriac Seyfo" (PDF). search.worldcat.org. Swedish Christian Study Centre. pp. 47–50.
- Talay, Shabo; Barthoma, Soner Onder, eds. (2018). Sayfo 1915: An Anthology of Essays on the Genocide of Assyrians/Arameans during the First World War. Gorgias Press. doi:10.31826/9781463239961. ISBN 9781463207304. ISSN 1539-1507.
- Çetinoğlu, Sait (July 20, 2017). "Genocide/Seyfo - and how resistance became a way of life". In Travis, Hannibal (ed.). The Assyrian Genocide: Cultural and Political Legacies. Translated by Bar Abraham, Abdulmesih. Routledge. ISBN 978-1-351-98025-8.
