= Gülgöze, Midyat =

Village in Mardin province, Turkey

Gülgöze
- Neighbourhood
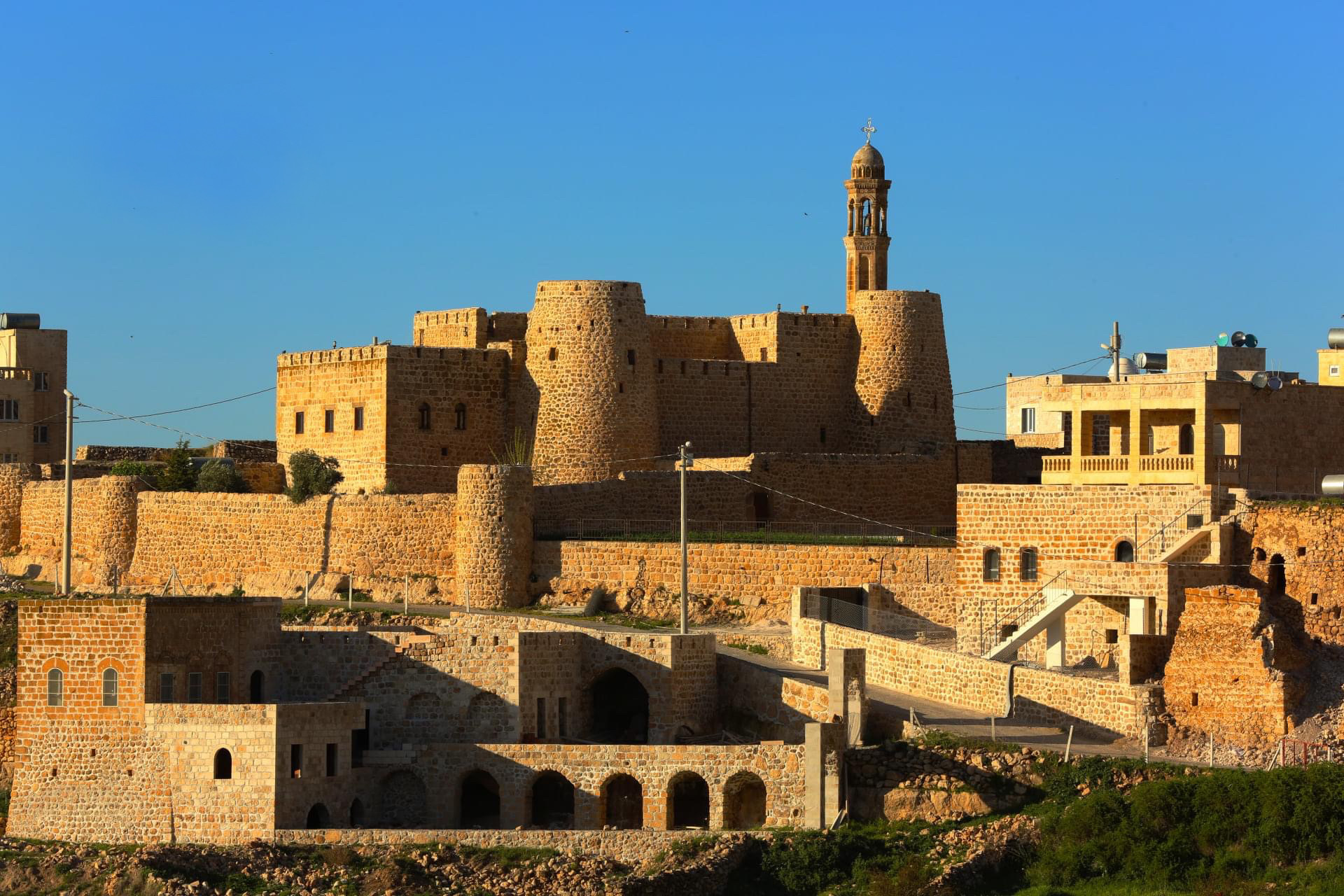
- Mor Hadbschabo Church in Iwardo

- Location within Turkey
- Coordinates: 37.407°N 41.489°E
- Country: Turkey
- Province: Mardin
- District: Midyat
- Population (2024): 245
- Time zone: UTC+3 (TRT)

Inwardo or Gülgöze (Syriac: ܥܝܢܘܪܕܐ, romanized: Iwardo, Inwardo, Ayin Warda, Ain Wardo) is a neighbourhood in the municipality and district of Midyat, Mardin Province, Turkey. Gülgöze is populated by Assyrians/Syriacs (Note: The terms "Assyrian" and "Syriac" are used to refer to the same people) and had a population of 245 in 2024.

In the village is the Syriac Orthodox Church of Mor Hadbşabo, which is in the care of a sole nun. Additionally, the village is home to the Churches of Mor Barsaumo and Kundel.

== Etymology ==
The Turkish and Syriac names for the village translate to "rose spring/source".

== History ==
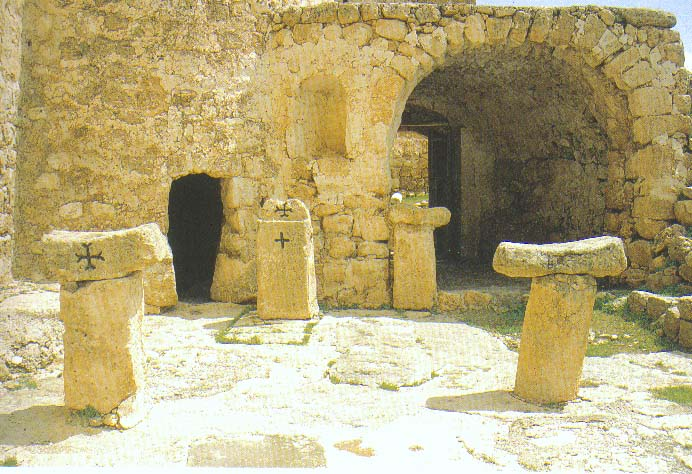
Old Christian symbols in Iwardo

The village of Iwardo is situated on top of three hills, and is considered one of the oldest Assyrian/Syriac villages in the Tur Abdin region. The Church of Mor Barsaumo is located on a hill parallel to Aynwardo, carved into a rock structure and built on an old settlement in the village. The Church of Kundel is located five kilometers northwest of the village and is believed to have been built between the 6th and 8th century, although its origins are unclear. Both are not believed to have been used as a church space in a long time, and the date of abandonment for the Church of Mor Barsaumo is unclear. Noting the rock shape architecture, it is likely that the church was converted from a cistern and was meant to meet the water needs of the villagers.

Ignatius Aphrem I records the Metropolitan Simon of Aynwardo as a saint who perfected the West Syriac script. Ignatius Hanukh from the village was the Patriarch of Tur Abdin from 1421 to 1444. In 1453, the village was captured by the Ottoman Empire. Kurdish raids in Midyat in 1855 caused the priest of the village, Karim, to commit suicide by plunging himself into a cistern. In the Syriac Orthodox patriarchal register of dues of 1870, it was recorded that the village had 81 households, who paid 232 dues, and was served by the Churches of Mori Hütab and Morti Šmüni, with no priest.

Prior to the start of the First World War, the village had about 200 Assyrian/Syriac families, all of whom belonged to the Syriac Orthodox Church. During the Sayfo, thousands of Assyrian and Yazidi refugees from throughout Tur Abdin arrived there for safety as the structure of the village allowed for considerable defense from the ensuing violence. Refugees arrived from villages including Habasnos, Midyat, Bote, Saleh, Keferze, Kafro Eloyto, Mzizah and Urnas. The Defence of Iwardo took place alongside the Defense of Azakh in what Ottoman authorities dubbed the "Midyat rebellion", and was led by a native of the village, Gallo Shabo. The defense lasted 52–60 days and remains significant to the collective memory of the genocide and the village's history, being compared to the Armenian Defense of Van (1915) and Musa Dagh.

A letter in the Secret Archive of the Vatican posits that 150 Assyrians were deported after Sayfo, with Aynwardo being one of the villages that they were expelled from. In the 1960s, the village had 300 Assyrian/Syriac families, decreasing to half that number in 1985. Between 1990 and 1994, 30 murders of Assyrians/Syriacs took place in Tur Abdin, with one of them being a priest of Aynwardo. By 2008, there were 10 Assyrian/Syriac families in Aynwardo, which decreased to five in 2015. In December 2017, an ancient settlement within the borders of the village was designated by the Ministry of Culture and Tourism as a first degree archaeological site with immovable architecture.

In 2020, only three Assyrian/Syriac families remained in the village as most have since immigrated to Europe (particularly Germany). There is also a diaspora community of about 200 families around Haworth, New Jersey. The Akbulut family continues to take care of the Mor Hadbşabo Church, although it does not have a priest. In 2024, a legend of a key that would help children with speech difficulties learn to talk began to surface on social media platforms. As part of diaspora initiatives, many Assyrians/Syriacs have since returned to the village as recently as 2024, encouraged by government reforms and public works projects. In 2025, a complex of eleven villas were completed and formally inaugurated by Syriac Orthodox patriarch Ignatius Aphrem II to welcome Assyrian returnees from the diaspora to the village.

== Demography ==
=== Families ===
The following is a list of the number of Syriac families that have inhabited Aynwardo per year stated. Unless otherwise stated, all figures are from the list provided in Eastern Christianity, Theological Reflection on Religion, Culture, and Politics in the Holy Land and Christian Encounter with Islam and the Muslim World, as noted in the bibliography below. (Note: The size of a single family varies between five and ten persons.)

- 1915: 200
- 1966: 140
- 1979: 96
- 1981: 91
- 1987: 93
- 1995: 60
- 1997: 7
- 2008: 10

=== Population ===
Historical population
Year	Pop.	±% p.a.
1997	177	—
2007	193	+0.87%
2012	216	+2.28%
2017	236	+1.79%
2022	237	+0.08%
2024	245	+1.67%
Source: Population census (1997) and TÜİK (2007-2024)

== Bibliography ==
- Barsoum, Aphrem (2003). The Scattered Pearls: A History of Syriac Literature and Sciences. Translated by Matti Moosa (2nd ed.). Gorgias Press.
- Barsoum, Aphrem (2008). The History of Tur Abdin. Translated by Matti Moosa. Gorgias Press.
- Emir, Başak. Documentation and Promotion of the Syriac Intangible Heritage in Mardin Region (PDF) (Report). Ambassador's Fund for Cultural Preservation.
- Bcheiry, Iskandar (2009). The Syriac Orthodox Patriarchal Register of Dues of 1870: An Unpublished Historical Document from the Late Ottoman Period. Gorgias Press.
- Brock, Sebastian (2021). "The Syrian Orthodox Church in the twentieth century". Eastern Christianity, Theological Reflection on Religion, Culture, and Politics in the Holy Land and Christian Encounter with Islam and the Muslim World (PDF). Living Stones of the Holy Land Trust. pp. 155–181.
- Courtois, Sébastien de (2004). The Forgotten Genocide: Eastern Christians, The Last Arameans. Translated by Vincent Aurora. Gorgias Press.
- Courtois, Sébastien de (2013). "Tur Abdin : Réflexions sur l'état présent descommunautés syriaques du Sud-Est de la Turquie,mémoire, exils, retours". Cahier du Gremmamo (in French). 21: 113–150.
- Gaunt, David; Atto, Naures; Barthoma, Soner (2017). Let Them Not Return: Sayfo – The Genocide against the Assyrian, Syriac and Chaldean Christians in the Ottoman Empire (PDF). Berghahn Books. ISBN 978-1-78533-499-3.
- Gaunt, David (2006). Massacres, Resistance, Protectors: Muslim-Christian Relations in Eastern Anatolia during World War I. Gorgias Press.
- Güsten, Susanne (August 2016). A Farewell to Tur Abdin (PDF) (Report). Istanbul Policy Center.
- Keser-Kayaalp, Elif, ed. (January 2022). Syriac Architectural Heritage at Risk in TurʿAbdin (PDF).
- Korkut, Tahsin (21 June 2023). "Midyat'ta Bir Kaya Kilisesi (Gülgöze/Ayn Wardo Mor Barsavmo Kilisesi)". Van Journal of Humanities and Social Sciences (5): 13–48.
- Travis, Hannibal (2017). The Assyrian Genocide: Cultural and Political Legacies. Routledge. doi:10.4324/9781315269832. ISBN 9781315269832.

== See also ==
- Defence of Iwardo
