= Bardakçı, Midyat =

Village in Mardin Province, Turkey

Bardakçı
- Neighbourhood
- Location in Turkey
- Coordinates: 37.485°N 41.432°E
- Country: Turkey
- Province: Mardin
- District: Midyat
- Population (2021): 164
- Time zone: UTC+3 (TRT)

Bardakçı (Arabic: باتي; Kurdish: Batê; (Note: Also spelt as Bate.) Syriac: ܒ̈ܬܐ, romanized: Bāti, lit. 'households') (Note: Alternatively transliterated as Bāte, Bātī, Bati, Bote, Botē, Bōte, Boté, Bothe, or Boti. Also called Batıköy in Turkish. Nisba: Bōtōyo or Bātī. Demonym: Botoye.) is a neighbourhood in the municipality and district of Midyat, Mardin Province in Turkey. The village is populated by Syriacs and by Kurds of the Arnas tribe and had a population of 164 in 2021. It is located in the historic region of Tur Abdin.

In the village, there is a Syriac Orthodox church of Mar Ephraim Malphono.

== History ==
In 1454 (AG 1765), men from Bāti (today called Bardakçı) were suffocated to death by smoke by Turks of the clan of Hasan Beg, as per the account of the priest Addai of Basibrina in c. 1500 appended to the Chronography of Bar Hebraeus. The calligrapher Clemis (Clement) Dawud (David) of Bāti (fl. 1483–1502) was ordained as a bishop by Masʿūd II of Ṭur ʿAbdin, Patriarch of Tur Abdin. Basil Behnam III, Syriac Orthodox Maphrian of the East (r. 1653–1655), was from Bāti. The emir Bidayn destroyed the Church of Mar Ephraim Malphono at Bāti and killed a number of villagers in 1714. In the Syriac Orthodox patriarchal register of dues of 1870, it was recorded that the village had 68 households, who paid 179 dues, and was served by the Church of Morī Afrīm and two priests.

In 1914, it was populated by 700 Syriacs, according to the list presented to the Paris Peace Conference by the Assyro-Chaldean delegation. There were 300 Syriac Orthodox families, 10 Syriac Catholic families, and 15 Kurdish families in 1915. The village was well known for its pottery. It was owned by Osman Ağa and the agha of the village was Saleh of the Dakshuri tribe.

Amidst the Sayfo, twenty soldiers were sent on 4 July 1915 by the authorities at Midyat ostensibly to guard the village and used the Syriac Catholic Church of Yoldath Aloho as their headquarters and barracks. After six days had passed, the villagers occupied the church in an attempt to induce the soldiers to leave, only for the soldiers to call for reinforcements who then surrounded the village. Kurds led by Jamil and Nejim, sons of Osman Ağa, attacked Bāti and destroyed the outer walls of both the Syriac Orthodox and Syriac Catholic churches whilst 1500 Syriacs took refuge in the church itself, where they were besieged with little food for thirteen days.

A few villagers escaped the church through a tunnel and fled to ‘Ayn-Wardo seeking help. The Turkish-Kurdish forces withdrew after sustaining losses in an attack from the rear by 150 partisans from ‘Ayn-Wardo, but the villagers could not be freed from the church and the partisans retreated after the Muslims had returned to surround the village. The Syriacs were forced to leave the church after exhausting their supplies of food and water and were seized and taken outside of Bāti and killed whilst about 70 people who fled through the tunnel were suffocated to death by smoke from a fire lit by the Muslims at the entrances. The survivors who had fled to ‘Ayn-Wardo returned to Bāti after seven years.

Iyawannis Ephraim of Bāti was ordained as metropolitan bishop of Tur Abdin at Homs in Syria at the end of March 1952. The population of the village was 725 in 1960. There were 552 Turoyo-speaking Christians in 75 families in 1966. Persecution in the 1970s caused the Syriacs at Bāti to seek asylum in the Netherlands, Germany, and Sweden. By 1987, there were no remaining Syriacs. The Syriac Catholic Church of Yoldath Aloho was converted into a mosque. The Bote Committee was established in 1999 by descendants of survivors of the Sayfo to restore the village's two churches. A mosque was constructed by the entrance to the village in 2005 by the Turkish state on land that had formerly belonged to Syriacs. There were no Syriacs at the village in 2013.

== Demography ==
The following is a list of the number of Syriac Orthodox families that have inhabited Bāti per year stated. Unless otherwise stated, all figures are from the list provided in The Syrian Orthodox Christians in the Late Ottoman Period and Beyond: Crisis then Revival, as noted in the bibliography below.

- 1915: 300
- 1966: 75
- 1978: 43
- 1979: 30
- 1981: 21
- 1987: 0

== Bibliography ==
- Atto, Naures (2011). Hostages in the Homeland, Orphans in the Diaspora: Identity Discourses Among the Assyrian/Syriac Elites in the European Diaspora (PDF). Leiden University Press.
- Barsoum, Aphrem (2003). The Scattered Pearls: A History of Syriac Literature and Sciences. Translated by Matti Moosa (2nd ed.). Gorgias Press.
- Barsoum, Aphrem (2008). The History of Tur Abdin. Translated by Matti Moosa. Gorgias Press.
- Bcheiry, Iskandar (2009). The Syriac Orthodox Patriarchal Register of Dues of 1870: An Unpublished Historical Document from the Late Ottoman Period. Gorgias Press.
- Bcheiry, Iskandar (2010). Collection of Historical Documents in Relation with the Syriac Orthodox Community in the Late Period of the Ottoman Empire. Gorgias Press.
- Biner, Zerrin Özlem (2020). States of Dispossession: Violence and Precarious Coexistence in Southeast Turkey. University of Pennsylvania Press.
- Courtois, Sébastien de (2004). The Forgotten Genocide: Eastern Christians, The Last Arameans. Translated by Vincent Aurora. Gorgias Press.
- Courtois, Sébastien de (2013). "Tur Abdin : Réflexions sur l'état présent descommunautés syriaques du Sud-Est de la Turquie, mémoire, exils, retours". Cahier du Gremmamo (in French). 21: 113–150.
- Dinno, Khalid S. (2017). The Syrian Orthodox Christians in the Late Ottoman Period and Beyond: Crisis then Revival. Gorgias Press.
- Gaunt, David (2006). Massacres, Resistance, Protectors: Muslim-Christian Relations in Eastern Anatolia during World War I. Gorgias Press.
- Jongerden, Joost; Verheij, Jelle, eds. (2012). Social Relations in Ottoman Diyarbekir, 1870-1915. Brill.
- Mutlu-Numansen, Sofia; Ossewaarde, Marinus (2019). "A Struggle for Genocide Recognition: How the Aramean, Assyrian, and Chaldean Diasporas Link Past and Present" (PDF). Holocaust and Genocide Studies. 33 (3): 412–428. doi:10.1093/hgs/dcz045.
- Palmer, Andrew (1990). Monk and Mason on the Tigris Frontier: The Early History of Tur Abdin. Cambridge University Press.
- Ritter, Hellmut (1967). Turoyo: Die Volkssprache der Syrischen Christen des Tur 'Abdin (in German). Vol. 1. Franz Steiner Verlag.
- Tan, Altan (2018). Turabidin'den Berriye'ye. Aşiretler - Dinler - Diller - Kültürler (in Turkish). Pak Ajans Yayincilik Turizm Ve Diş Ticaret Limited şirketi. ISBN 9789944360944.
- Tozman, Markus (2012). "Cadastral Registration of Lands and Preservation Orders in Turkey's South-East: Subtle Forms of Discrimination?". In Pieter Omtzigt; Markus K. Tozman; Andrea Tyndall (eds.). The Slow Disappearance of the Syriacs from Turkey and of the Grounds of the Mor Gabriel Monastery (PDF). LIT Verlag Münster. pp. 139–156.
- Travis, Hannibal, ed. (2018). The Assyrian Genocide: Cultural and Political Legacies (PDF). Routledge.
