= Defense of Azakh =

1915 battle during the Assyrian genocide

- Part of the Assyrian and Armenian genocides
Date	August 18, 1915 – November 21, 1915 (3 months and 3 days)
Location	Azakh, Ottoman Empire 37°20′30″N 41°53′30″E
Result	Assyrian victory

Belligerents
(Assyrian homeland) Assyrian Defenders; Armenian fedayi	Ottoman Empire: Allied Kurdish tribes

Commanders and leaders
(Assyrian homeland) Işo Hanna Gabre	(Ottoman Empire) Ömer Naci Bey

Units involved
(Assyrian homeland) Azakh National Assembly (Assyrian homeland) "Christ's Fedayi" (Those who sacrifice for Christ.)	(Ottoman Empire) 3rd Division (Ottoman Empire) Ottoman mujahideen (Ottoman Empire) Allied Kurdish tribes

Strength
(Assyrian homeland) (First Republic of Armenia) 4,000 (mostly Assyrians but also including few Armenians)	(Ottoman Empire) 8,000+

Casualties and losses
1,200 Christians were killed during the siege.	Heavy

The Defense of Azakh took place between August 18, 1915 and November 21, 1915 and was one of the few remaining pockets of resistance during the Assyrian genocide that took place in Azakh (Syriac: ܐܙܟ, romanized: Azakh). The Azakh defense was coupled with the Defense of Iwardo, which also took place during Sayfo.

The story of the defense remains significant to the memory of the survivors of the massacre and their descendants, as it showed the willingness of the Assyrians to defend themselves and their homeland at a dangerous time. Despite the attempts of Ottoman authorities and Kurdish tribes to inflict more death on the Christians of Azakh, they were unsuccessful and were eventually forced to withdraw their forces.

== Background ==
The village of Azakh (modern day İdil) is perched on a hill at 1,000m altitude and is close to the eastern border of Tur Abdin in southeastern Turkey, near Cizre. At the start of the 20th century, the village had a population of 1,000 people, who were mixed with Syriac Orthodox and Syriac Catholic Christians.

Azakh was victim to violence and killings from Ottoman and Kurdish soldiers during Sayfo. In April 1915, national assemblyman of the Committee of Union and Progress Aziz Feyzi Pirinççizâde was sent to Cizre to agitate local Kurdish tribes into attacking the non-Muslim population, but this turned out to be slow. Starting in May 1915, many Assyrian families from surrounding villages as well as some Armenians sought protection from massacres, as it became increasingly apparent that an attack was incoming. The conflict began as Kurdish tribes and other local Muslim militias began to raid and destroy small Assyrian villages throughout Tur Abdin throughout the summer of 1915. Most villages were unprepared and fell quickly to the Kurdish raiders into June and July.

The Ottoman Empire was well aware that it was acting against populations who were not Armenian. Through the Ottoman millet system, the members of the Church of the East were called "Nasturi" (i.e. Nestorian), the members of the Syriac Orthodox Church were called "Süryani" and the members of the Chaldean Catholic Church were called "Keldani". Since the campaign was not part of the backdrop of the anti-Armenian sentiment of the Ottoman government, it was more likely due to local circumstances that the Assyrians of the area were attacked. As the Assyrians armed themselves and put up a resistance, Talaat Pasha sent the order to permanently drive them from the Hakkari mountains. Minister of War Enver Pasha ordered the suppression of Azakh using "utmost severity".

By July, a Kurdish confrontation was building up, and more than a thousand defenders had gathered in Azakh. A group of 50 volunteers was formed, the "Jesus Fedai", and defense works were built. The leader of the Azakh National Assembly who organized the resistance was mayor Işo Hanna Gabre, while other members included: Tuma Abde Kette, Behnan Isko, Murad Hannoush, Andrawos Hanna Eliya, Yaqub Hanna Gabre and Behnam Aqrawi. The village of Azakh was first surrounded in mid-August.

== Defense and battle ==
Azakh was first attacked on August 18 by an assembly of Kurdish tribes, leading into a counterattack by the village Fedayi led by the son of the village leader. On the night of August 26, they managed to capture and destroy strategic positions of the Kurds who withdrew from Azakh on September 9 after suffering heavy casualties. However, this prompted Ottoman authorities to deploy regular troops against the Azakh defense. The case of the conflict of Azakh was then passed from the civil officials and given to the military for them to handle.

General Halil Kut was deceitfully informed that "one thousand armed Armenians had gathered lately and started an assault destroying Muslim villages nearby and massacred their inhabitants" while he was passing through the area with an army division on its way to Bagdad, similarly to a secret Turkish-German expeditionary force tasked with infiltrating Iran, led by Ömer Naci Bey, with the German contingent led by Max Erwin von Scheubner-Richter. This expeditionary force of 650 cavalry and two pieces of field artillery was also diverted to Azakh as they were traveling in the same direction tasked with suppressing the rebels who were falsely accused of "cruelly massacring the Muslim people in the area." Naci Bey previously made claims that the villagers of Azakh were "Armenian rebels" that had committed terrible massacres against the Muslim population, though he did not name the villages where Muslims were said to have been massacred. French historian Raymond Kévorkian believes these claims were made to implicate German involvement in the massacres and to legitimize military operations against the Assyrians of Azakh. On October 29, 1915, Naci Bey requested reinforcements to assist with the siege, while Talaat Pasha ordered 500 mujahideen under his command to assist Naci.

The German contingent reacted negatively to this decision as Scheubner-Richter did not permit any of his German forces to participate. According to Paul Leverkuehn (his biographer), Scheubner-Richter was not convinced by the Turkish accusations, and didn't believe that it was a real rebellion. This topic was discussed by General Field Marshal Colmar Freiherr von der Goltz and the ambassador in Constantinople Konstantin von Neurath consulted with Chancellor Theobald von Bethmann Hollweg on how to react to the targeting of Ottoman Christian subjects in Anatolia. Neurath wrote:

The request of the Field Marshal was caused by the expedition against a number of Christians of Syriac confession that had been planned for a long time. They are allied with the Armenians and have fortified themselves in difficult terrain between Mardin and Midyat in order to get away from the massacres that the governor of Diyarbakir has organized.

General von der Goltz, as well as the other German military commanders involved, decided to forbid all German military involvement in the siege of Azakh. Later on, Scheubner-Richter reflected that the Turkish allegations had probably been a ruse to get the Germans military involved in the siege. At this time, Naci Bey was also convinced that those who were being attacked were not Armenians.

On November 7, the Ottoman army began their frontal assault on the village of Azakh, but the assault turned out to be a failure with heavy losses. Although negotiations had taken place during the siege regarding the non-Armenian Assyrian ethnicity of the villagers, this was to no avail. A surprise attack on the Turkish camp took place on November 13–14, leading to a large number of soldiers and officers were killed. This led to chaos among the surviving Turkish soldiers in the camp which led to their flight. With this victory, the Azakh fedayi managed to capture large quantities of modern weapons that the Turkish soldiers left behind. As the Ottoman siege of the small village of Azakh had turned into a military fiasco as the hardened villagers put up a surprising resistance.

Negotiations for a truce began on November 16 after the surprise attack, as Ömer Naci Bey had to restore some form of honor. Troops began to pull out of Azakh starting November 21, and by the last week of November, he had pulled out his troops from Azakh. The leaders of Azakh reportedly swore out, "We all have to die sometime, do not die in shame and humiliation." During this month, Kâmil Pasha wrote to Enver Pasha stating that he was forced to abort the village following the defense, and argued for postponing any further engagement until a more opportune moment.

== Aftermath and legacy ==
After the end of World War I and the establishment of the Kemalist Turkish Republic, in 1927 the villagers of Azakh decided to hand over their weapons to the Turkish government after receiving reassurance for their security by the state. After the villagers were disarmed, Kemalist agents assassinated and imprisoned members of the Azakh National Assembly while the rest were hunted by the courts of Diyarbakir. Following a Kurdish and Yezidi revolt against the Turkish government, Assyrians from Azakh faced deportations to Baghdad, with mass killing and rape following suit. Some of the population of Azakh emigrated to Brazil from Palestine following the genocide.

Retrospective accounts of the defense of Azakh show how the Assyrians of Diyarbekir Vilayet made significant resistance to Ottoman and Kurdish forces. Although other battles and fighting took place in Tur Abdin (Benabil (Bulbul), Beth-Debe, Hah, Hebob, Kerboran (Dergecit), and Zaz), the strongest stand was in Azakh, Iwardo, and Basibrin. The story of the defense survives due to a language vernacular written by a Syriac Catholic priest and schoolteacher from the village, Gabriyel Tuma-Hëndo, which details the circumstances and aftermath of the siege. The story was translated to Swedish through the efforts of the Tur Abdin diaspora. Music from the diaspora have also highlighted the gabore (Syriac: ܓܢܒܖܐ, lit. 'heroes') who defended Azakh, as well as Iwardo and other neighboring villages.

Accounts of the story posit that the victory of the "Jesus Fedayi" is attributed to the Virgin of Azakh/the Virgin Mary and her protection of the village during the siege. A German officer who converted to Catholicism stated that he had seen a cannon firing at Ottoman forces, despite there being no such weapon, and that the Virgin Mary had stood over Azakh to protect it during the defense. In 2005, Azakh had one Syriac Orthodox Church, "The Virgin of Azakh", named after the story of the defense.

Many of the Assyrians who were originally from Azakh moved to Al-Malikiyah in northeastern Syria, bringing with them a unique dialect of Arabic. In the city is the Syriac Orthodox Church of Our Lady (Arabic: كنيسة السيدة العذراء للسريان الأرثوذكس), which is dedicated to the story of the defense of Azakh. In Syria, the story of the defense remains integral to the collective memory of both Sayfo and for differentiating Assyrians from Kurds in the country. Much like Assyrians in Al-Qahtaniyah, the stories of the defense are often not passed down to newer generations, owing to the formation of a uniquely religious identity.

== Bibliography ==
- Akdemir, Mary (January 31, 2023). "Big Secrets, Small Villages: The Collective Memory of the Assyrian Genocide". In Akçam, Taner; Kyriakidis, Theodosios; Chatzikyriakidis, Kyriakos (eds.). The Genocide of the Christian Populations in the Ottoman Empire and its Aftermath (1908-1923) (1st ed.). London: Routledge. doi:10.4324/9781003207221. ISBN 9781003207221.
- Atto, Naures (2011). Hostages in the Homeland, Orphans in the Diaspora: Identity Discourses Among the Assyrian/Syriac Elites in the European Diaspora (PDF). Leiden University Press.
- DelCogliano, Mark (January 7, 2006). Syriac Monasticism in Tur Abdin: A Present-Day Account. Vol. 41. Cistercian Studies Quarterly. pp. 341–343.
- Gaunt, David (2006). Massacres, Resistance, Protectors: Muslim-Christian Relations in Eastern Anatolia During World War I. Berghahn Books. ISBN 978-1-78533-499-3.
- Gaunt, David (2015). "The Complexity of the Assyrian Genocide". Genocide Studies International. 9 (1): 83–103. doi:10.1353/gsp.2015.0002. ISSN 2291-1847.
- Gaunt, David; Atto, Naures; Barthoma, Soner O. (May 1, 2017). Let Them Not Return: Sayfo – The Genocide Against the Assyrian, Syriac, and Chaldean Christians in the Ottoman Empire. Berghahn Books. ISBN 978-1-78533-499-3.
- Gaunt, David (November 1, 2020). "The Long Assyrian Genocide". In Astourian, Stephan; Kévorkian, Raymond (eds.). Collective and State Violence in Turkey: The Construction of a National Identity from Empire to Nation-State. Berghahn Books. p. 85. ISBN 978-1-78920-451-3.
- Gaunt, David (September 27, 2023). Adak, Hülya; Göçek, Fatma Müge; Suny, Ronald Grigor (eds.). Critical Approaches to Genocide: History, Politics and Aesthetics of 1915 (1st ed.). Routledge. doi:10.4324/9780429023163. ISBN 9780429023163.
- Kévorkian, Raymond (March 30, 2011). The Armenian Genocide: A Complete History. Bloomsbury Publishing. ISBN 978-0-85771-930-0.
- Lingius, Lars Hillås (2015). "In Times of Genocide, 1915-2015: report from a conference on the Armenian Genocide and Syriac Seyfo" (PDF). search.worldcat.org. Swedish Christian Study Centre. pp. 47–50.
- Morris, Benny; Ze’evi, Dror (April 24, 2019). The Thirty-Year Genocide: Turkey's Destruction of Its Christian Minorities, 1894–1924. Harvard University Press. ISBN 978-0-674-91645-6.
- Sato, Noriko (2018). "THE MEMORY OF SAYFO AND ITS RELATION TO THE IDENTITY OF CONTEMPORARY ASSYRIAN/ARAMEAN CHRISTIANS IN SYRIA". Sayfo 1915: An Anthology of Essays on the Genocide of Assyrians/Arameans during the First World War. Gorgias Press. pp. 305–327. ISBN 9781463239961. ISSN 1539-1507.
- Çetinoğlu, Sait (July 20, 2017). "Genocide/Seyfo - and how resistance became a way of life". In Travis, Hannibal (ed.). The Assyrian Genocide: Cultural and Political Legacies. Translated by Bar Abraham, Abdulmesih. Routledge. ISBN 978-1-351-98025-8.
