= Sayfo =

Genocide of Assyrians (1914–1924)

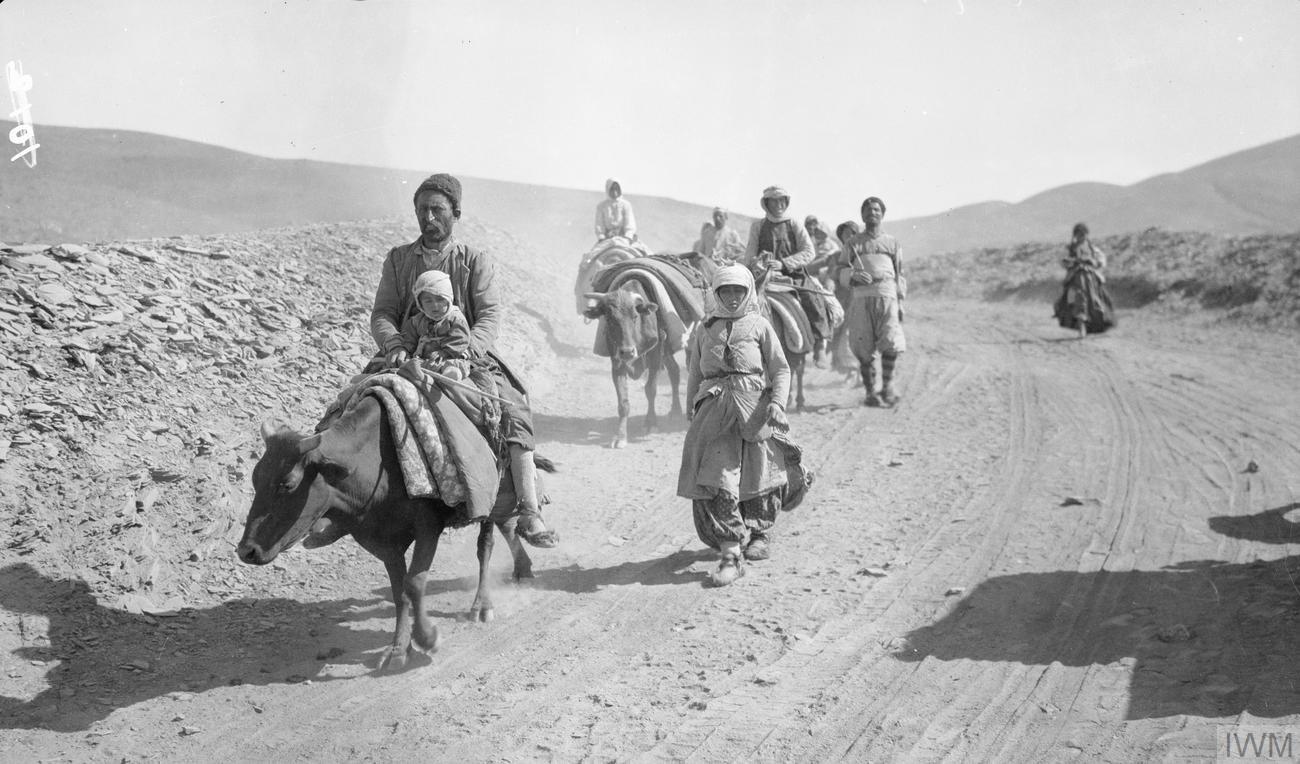
Jilu Assyrians crossing the Asadabad Pass towards Baqubah, 1918

The Sayfo (Syriac: ܣܲܝܦܵܐ, lit. 'sword'), also known as the Seyfo or the Assyrian genocide, was the mass killing and deportation of Assyrian/Syriac Christians in southeastern Anatolia and Persia's Azerbaijan province by Ottoman forces and some Kurdish tribes during World War I.

The Assyrians were divided into mutually antagonistic churches, including the Syriac Orthodox Church, the Assyrian Church of the East, and the Chaldean Catholic Church. Before World War I, they largely lived in mountainous and remote areas of the Ottoman Empire and Persia, some of which were effectively stateless. The Ottoman Empire's nineteenth-century centralization efforts led to increased violence and danger for the Assyrians.

Mass killing of Assyrian civilians began during the Ottoman occupation of Azerbaijan from January to May 1915, during which massacres were committed by Ottoman forces and pro-Ottoman Kurds. In Bitlis province, Ottoman troops returning from Persia joined local Kurdish tribes to massacre the local Christian population (Armenians and Assyrians). Ottoman forces and Kurds attacked the Assyrian tribes of Hakkari in mid-1915, driving them out by September despite the tribes mounting a coordinated military defense. Governor Mehmed Reshid initiated a genocide of all of the Christian communities in Diyarbekir province, including Syriac Christians, facing only sporadic armed resistance in some parts of Tur Abdin. Ottoman Assyrians living farther south, in present-day Iraq and Syria, were not targeted in the genocide.

The Sayfo occurred concurrently with and was closely related to the Armenian genocide, although the Sayfo is considered to have been less systematic. Local actors played a larger role than the Ottoman government, but the latter also ordered attacks on certain Assyrians. Motives for killing included a perceived lack of loyalty among some Assyrian communities to the Ottoman Empire and the desire to appropriate their land. At the 1919 Paris Peace Conference, the Assyro-Chaldean delegation said that its losses were 250,000, about half the pre-war population. The accuracy of this figure is unknown. They later revised their estimate to 275,000 dead at the Lausanne Conference in 1923. The Sayfo is less studied than the Armenian genocide. Efforts to have it recognized as a genocide began during the 1990s, spearheaded by the Assyrian diaspora. Although several countries acknowledge that Assyrians in the Ottoman Empire were victims of a genocide, this assertion is rejected by the Turkish government.

== Terminology ==
There is no universally accepted translation in English for the endonym Suryoyo or Suryoye. The choice of which term to use, such as Assyrian, Syriac, Aramean, and Chaldean, is often determined by political alignment. The Church of the East was the first to adopt an identity derived from ancient Assyria. The Syriac Orthodox Church has officially rejected the use of Assyrian in favor of Syrian since 1952, although not all Syriac Orthodox reject Assyrian identity.

Since the Ottoman Empire was organized by religion, Ottoman officials referred to populations by their religious affiliation rather than ethnicity. Therefore, according to historian David Gaunt, "speaking of an 'Assyrian Genocide' is anachronistic". In Neo-Aramaic, the languages historically spoken by Assyrians, it has been known since 1915 as Sayfo or Seyfo (ܣܝܦܐ, lit. 'sword'), which, since the tenth century, has also meant 'extermination' or 'extinction'. Other terms used by some Assyrians include nakba (Arabic for 'catastrophe') and firman (Turkish for 'order', as Assyrians believed that they were killed according to an official decree).

== Background ==
The people now called Assyrian, Chaldean, or Aramean are native to Upper Mesopotamia and historically spoke Aramaic varieties, and their ancestors converted to Christianity in the first centuries CE. The first major schism in Syriac Christianity dates to 410, when Christians in the Sasanian Empire formed the Church of the East to distinguish themselves from the official religion of the Roman Empire. The West Syriac church, later the Syriac Orthodox Church, was persecuted by Roman rulers for theological differences but remained separate from the Church of the East. The schisms in Syriac Christianity were fueled by political divisions between empires and personal antagonism between clergymen.

Middle Eastern Christian communities were devastated by the Crusades and the Mongol invasions. The Chaldean and Syriac Catholic Churches split from the Church of the East and the Syriac Orthodox Church, respectively, during the sixteenth and seventeenth centuries and entered into full communion with the Catholic Church. Each church considered the others heretical.

=== Assyrians in the Ottoman Empire ===
The percent of the prewar population which was Assyrian, presented by the Assyro-Chaldean delegation to the 1919 Paris peace conference. More than 50% 30–40% 20–30% 10–20% 5–10%

In its millet system, the Ottoman Empire recognized religious denominations rather than ethnic groups: Süryaniler / Yakubiler (Syriac Orthodox or Jacobites), Nasturiler (Church of the East or Nestorians), and Keldaniler (Chaldean Catholic Church). Until the nineteenth century, these groups were part of the Armenian millet. Assyrians in the Ottoman Empire lived in remote, mountainous areas, where they had settled to avoid state control. Although this remoteness enabled Assyrians to avoid military conscription and taxation, it also cemented internal differences and prevented the emergence of a collective identity similar to the Armenian national movement. Unlike the Armenians, Syriac Christians did not control a disproportionate part of Ottoman commerce and did not have significant populations in nearby hostile countries.

There were no accurate estimates of the prewar Assyrian population, but Gaunt gives a possible figure of 500,000 to 600,000. Midyat, in Diyarbekir province (vilayet), was the only town in the Ottoman Empire with an Assyrian majority (Syriac Orthodox, Chaldeans, and Protestants). Syriac Orthodox Christians were concentrated in the hilly rural areas around Midyat, known as Tur Abdin, where they lived in almost 100 villages and worked in agriculture or crafts. Syriac Orthodox culture was centered in two monasteries near Mardin (west of Tur Abdin): Mor Gabriel and Deyrulzafaran. Outside the core area of Syriac settlement, there were also sizable populations in villages and the towns of Urfa, Harput, and Adiyaman. Unlike the Syriac population of Tur Abdin, many of these Syriacs spoke non-Aramaic languages.

Under the Qudshanis-based Patriarch of the Church of the East, Assyrian tribes controlled the Hakkari mountains east of Tur Abdin (adjacent to the Ottoman–Persian border). Hakkari is very mountainous, with peaks reaching 4,000 metres (13,000 ft) and separated by steep gorges; many areas were only accessible by footpaths carved into the mountainsides. The Assyrian tribes sometimes fought each other on behalf of their Kurdish allies. Church of the East settlement began in the east on the western shore of Lake Urmia in Persia; a Chaldean enclave was just north, in Salamas. There was a Chaldean area around Siirt in Bitlis province (northeast of Tur Abdin and northwest of Hakkari, less mountainous than Hakkari), but most Chaldeans lived farther south in present-day Iraq.

=== Worsening conflicts ===
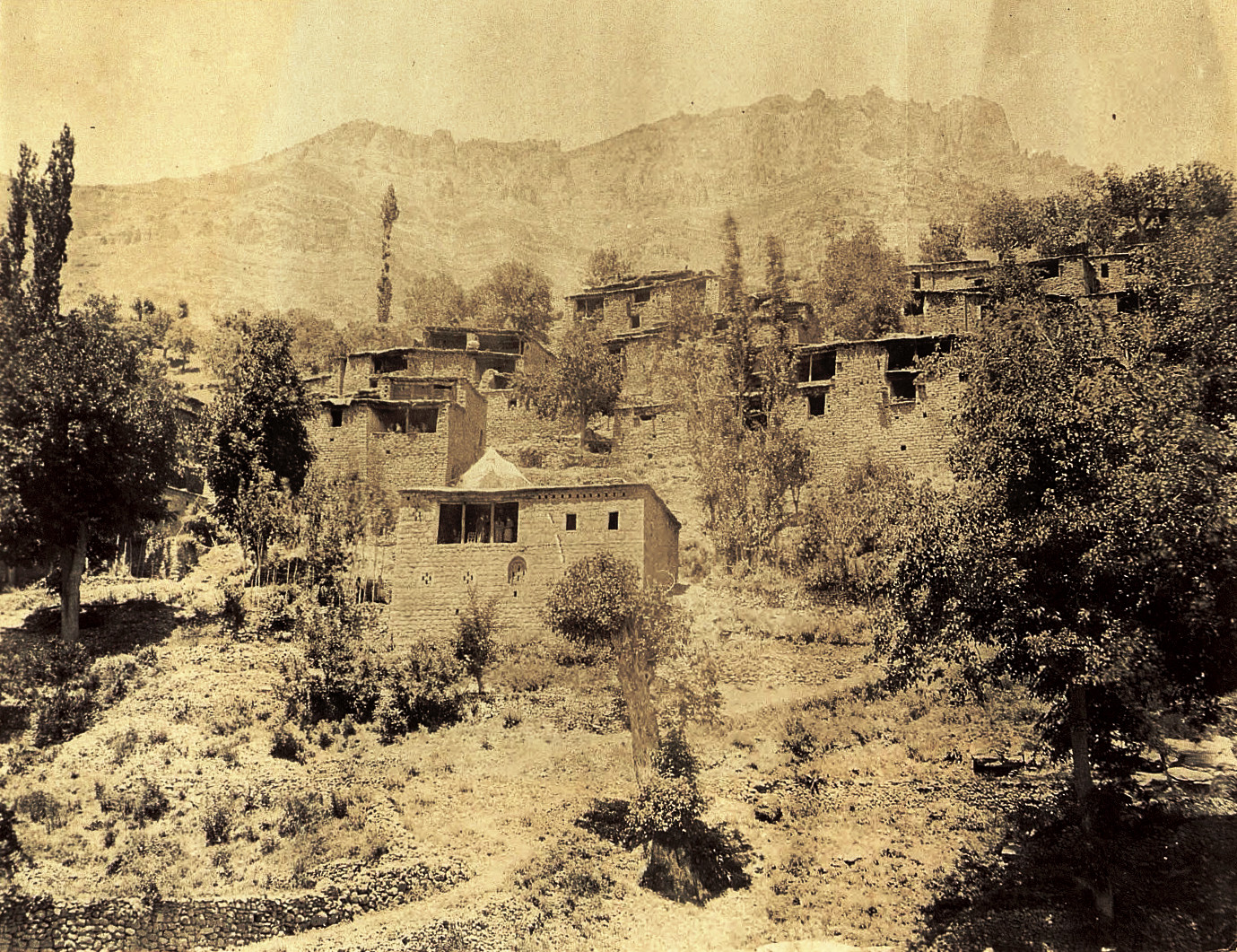
Mata Khtata, a Baz village in Hakkari, c. 1900

Although the Kurds and Assyrians were well-integrated with each other, Gaunt writes that this integration "led straight into a world marked by violence, raiding, the kidnapping and rape of women, hostage taking, cattle stealing, robbery, plundering, the torching of villages and a state of chronic unrest". Assyrian efforts to maintain their autonomy collided with the Ottoman Empire's nineteenth-century attempts at centralization and modernization to assert control over what had effectively been a stateless region. The first mass violence targeting Assyrians was in the mid-1840s, when Kurdish emir Bedir Khan devastated Hakkari and Tur Abdin, killing several thousands. During intertribal feuds, the bulk of the violence was directed at Christian villages under the protection of the opposing tribe.

During the Russo-Turkish War of 1877–1878, the Ottoman state armed the Kurds with modern weapons to fight Russia. When the Kurds refused to return the weapons at the end of the war, Assyrians—relying on older weapons—were at a disadvantage and subject to increasing violence. The irregular Hamidiye cavalry were formed in the 1880s from Kurdish tribes loyal to the government; their exemption from civil and military law enabled them to commit acts of violence with impunity.

The rise of political Islam in the form of Kurdish shaikhs also widened the divide between the Assyrians and the Muslim Kurds. Many Assyrians were killed in the 1895 massacres of Diyarbekir. Violence worsened after the 1908 Young Turk Revolution, despite Assyrian hopes that the new government would stop promoting anti-Christian Islamism. In 1908, 12,000 Assyrians were expelled from the Lizan valley by the Kurdish emir of Barwari. Due to increasing Kurdish attacks which Ottoman authorities did nothing to prevent, Patriarch of the Church of the East Mar Shimun XIX Benyamin began negotiations with the Russian Empire before World War I.

== World War I ==
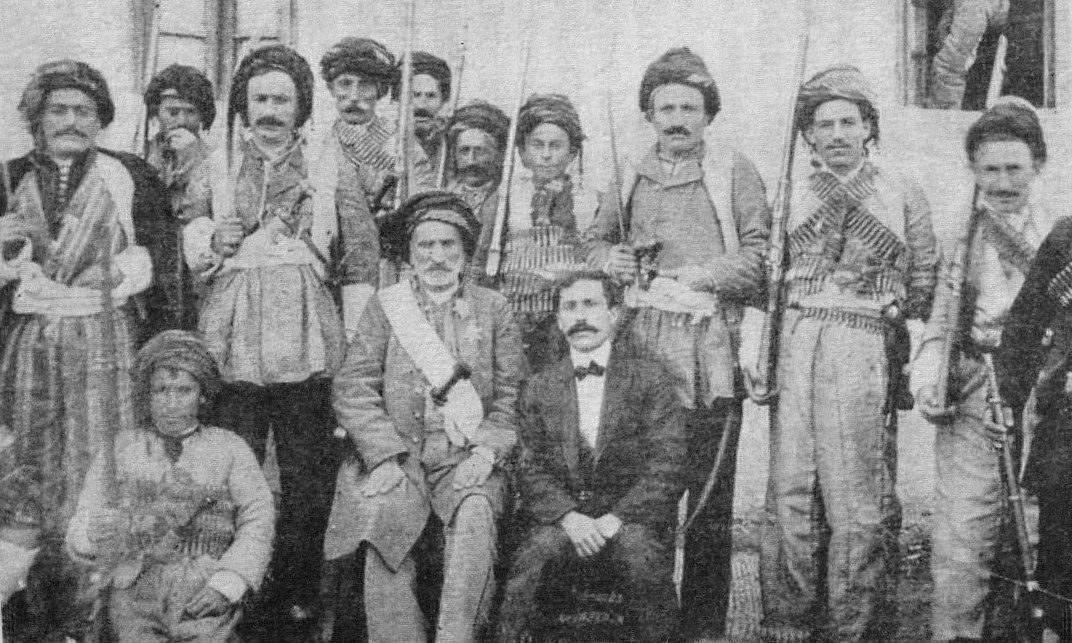
Assyrian warriors from Tergawar, a Persian border district

Before the war, Russia and the Ottoman Empire courted populations in each other's territory to wage guerrilla warfare behind enemy lines. The Ottoman Empire tried to enlist Caucasian Muslims and Armenians, as well as Assyrians and Azeris in Persia, and Russia looked to the Armenians, Kurds, and Assyrians living in the Ottoman Empire. Prior to the war, Russia controlled parts of northeastern Persia, including Azerbaijan and Tabriz.

Like other genocides, the Sayfo had a number of causes. The rise of nationalism led to competing Turkish, Kurdish, Persian, and Arab national movements, which contributed to increasing violence in the already conflict-ridden borderlands inhabited by the Assyrians. Historian Donald Bloxham emphasizes the negative influence of European powers interfering in the Ottoman Empire under the premise of protecting Ottoman Christians. This imperialism put the Ottoman Christians at risk of retaliatory attacks. In 1912 and 1913, the Ottoman loss in the Balkan Wars triggered an exodus of Muslim refugees from the Balkans.

The Committee of Union and Progress (CUP) government decided to resettle the refugees in eastern Anatolia, on land confiscated from populations deemed disloyal to the empire. There was a direct connection between the deportation of the Christian population and the resettlement of Muslims in the depopulated areas. The goals of the population replacement were to Turkify the Balkan Muslims and end the perceived internal threat from the Christian populations. With local politicians predisposed to violence against non-Muslims, these factors helped generate the preconditions for genocide.

The paramilitary Special Organization operated as spies and saboteurs in the Ottoman borderlands. The Ottoman Empire ordered a full mobilization for war on 24 July 1914, and concluded the German–Ottoman alliance shortly thereafter. In August 1914, the CUP sent a delegation to an Armenian conference offering an autonomous Armenian region if the Armenian Revolutionary Federation incited a pro-Ottoman revolt in Russia in the event of war. The Armenians refused. According to Gaunt, a similar offer was probably made to Mar Shimun in Van on 3 August. After returning to Qudshanis, Mar Shimun sent letters urging his followers to "fulfill strictly all their duties to the Turks". The Assyrians in Hakkari (like many other Ottoman subjects) resisted conscription into the Ottoman army during the mobilization, and many fled to Persia in August. Those in Mardin, however, accepted conscription.

== Ethnic cleansing of Hakkari ==
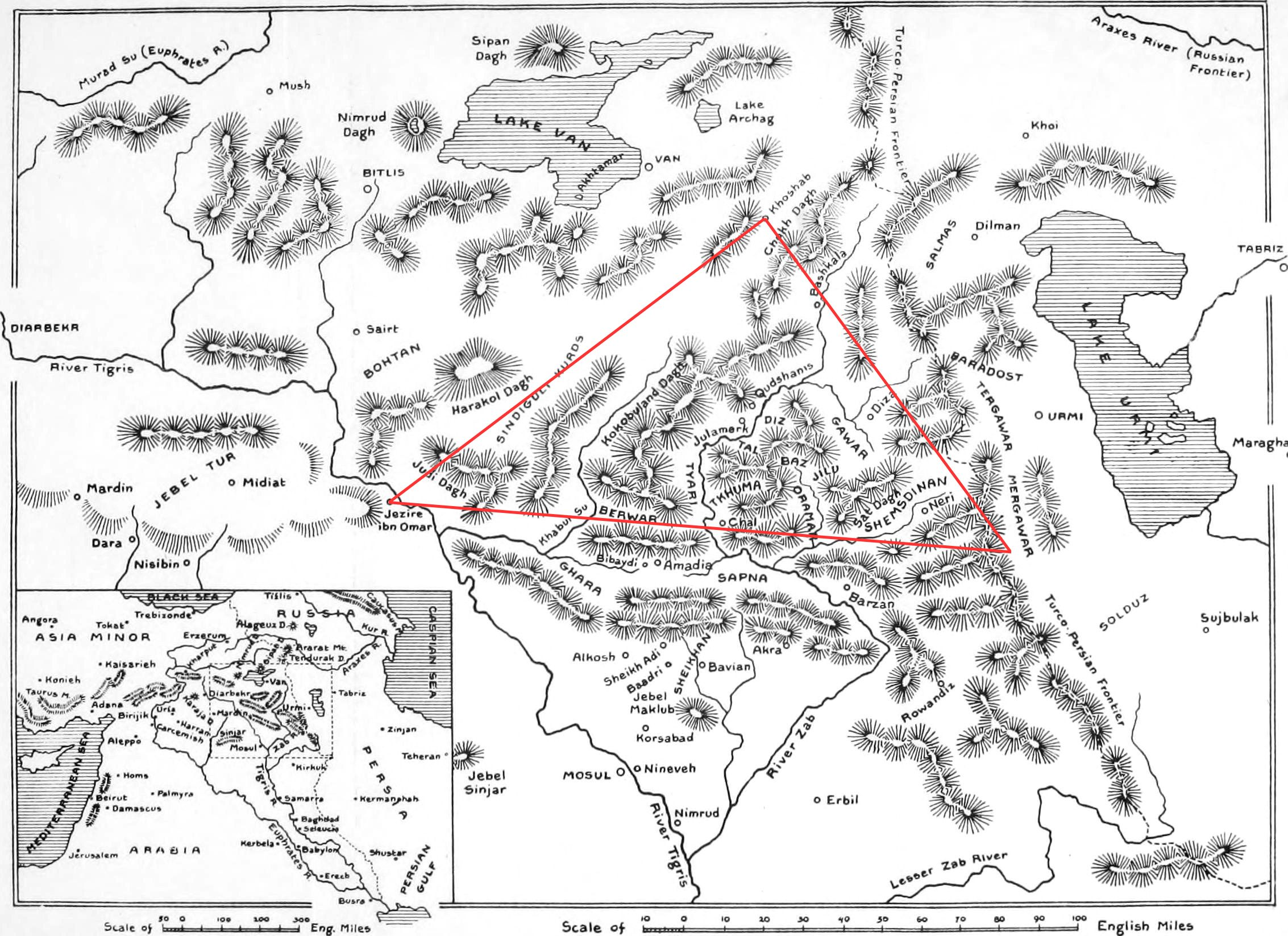
A 1922 map of the Southeastern Anatolia region. The historical region of Hakkari is the mountainous area in the triangle formed roughly north of Amadia and southeast of the line going south-to-north from Jezire ibn Omar to Khoshab, all west of the Ottoman–Persian border. Note that archaic place names are used on this map.

=== Massacres of lowland Assyrians ===
In August 1914, Assyrians in nine villages near the border were forced to flee to Persia and their villages were burned after they refused to join the Ottoman army. On 26 October 1914, a few days before the Ottoman Empire entered World War I, Ottoman interior minister Talaat Pasha sent a telegram to Djevdet Bey, the governor of Van province (which included Hakkari). In a planned Ottoman attack in Persia, the loyalty of the Hakkari Assyrians was doubted. Talaat ordered the deportation and resettlement of the Assyrians who lived near the Persian border with Muslims farther west. No more than twenty Assyrians would live in each resettlement, destroying their culture, language, and traditional way of life.

Gaunt cites this order as the beginning of the Sayfo. The government in Van reported that the order could not be implemented due to the lack of forces to carry it out, and by 5 November the expected Assyrian unrest did not materialize. Assyrians in Julamerk and Gawar were arrested or killed, and Ottoman irregulars attacked Assyrian villages throughout Hakkari in retaliation for their refusal to follow the order. The Assyrians, unaware of the government's role in these events until December 1914, protested to the governor of Van.

The Ottoman garrison in the border town of Bashkale was commanded by Kazim Karabekir, and the local Special Organization branch by Ömer Naji. Russian forces captured Bashkale and Sarai in November 1914 and held both for a few days. After their recapture by the Ottomans, the towns' local Christians were punished as collaborators, out of proportion to any actual collaboration. Local Ottoman forces consisting of gendarmerie, Hamidiye irregulars, and Kurdish volunteers were unable to mount attacks on the Assyrian tribes on the highlands, confining their attacks to poorly-armed Christian villages in the plains. Refugees from the area told the Russian army that "nearly the entire male Christian population of Gawar and Bashkale" had been massacred. In May 1915, Ottoman forces retreating from Bashkale massacred hundreds of Armenian women and children before continuing to Siirt.

=== Preparations for war ===
Mar Shimun learned about the massacre of Assyrians in lowland areas, and believed that the highland tribes would be next. Via Agha Petros, an Assyrian interpreter for the Russian consulate in Urmia, he contacted the Russian authorities. Shimun traveled to Bashkale to meet Mehmed Shefik Bey, an Ottoman official sent from Mardin to win over the Assyrians for the Ottoman cause, in December 1914. Shefik promised protection and money in exchange for a written promise that the Assyrians would not side with Russia or permit their tribes to take up arms against the Ottoman government. The tribal chiefs considered the offer, but rejected it.

In January 1915, Kurds blocked the route from Qudshanis to the Assyrian tribes. The patriarch's sister, Surma D'Bait Mar Shimun, left Qudshanis the following month with 300 men. Early in 1915, the tribes of Hakkari were preparing to defend themselves from a large-scale attack; they decided to send women and children to the area around Chamba in Upper Tyari, leaving only combatants behind.

On 10 May, the Assyrian tribes met and declared war (or a general mobilization) against the Ottoman Empire. In June, Mar Shimun traveled to Persia to ask for Russian support. He met with General Fyodor Chernozubov in the Salmas valley, who promised support. The patriarch and Agha Petros also met Russian consul Basil Nikitin in Salmas shortly before 21 June, but the promised Russian help never materialized.

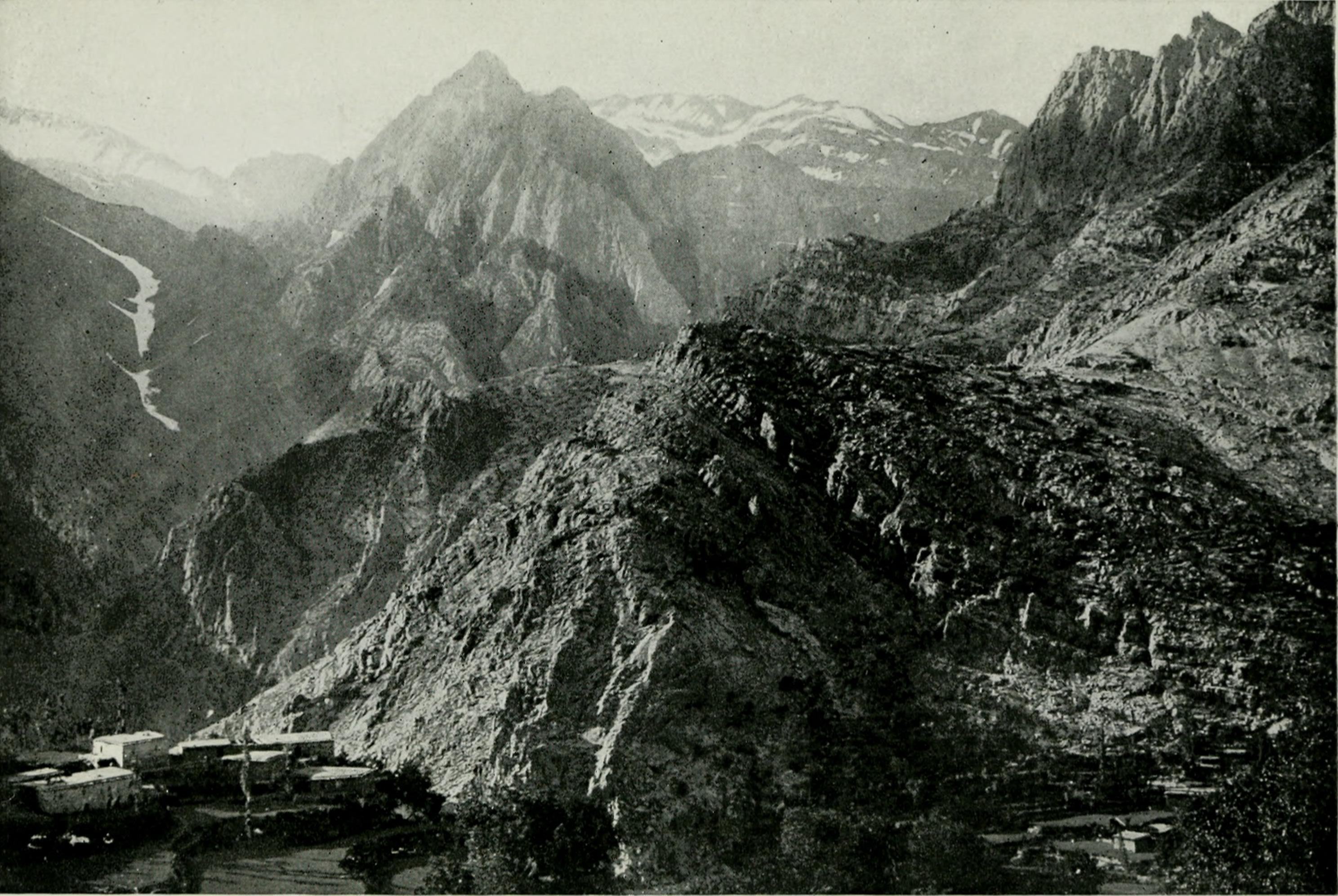
Oramar, looking northward across the gorge toward the crags of Supa Durig between Jilu and Baz

In May, Assyrian warriors were part of the Russian force which was rushed to relieve the defense of Van; Haydar Bey, the governor of Mosul, was given the power to invade Hakkari. Talaat ordered him to drive the Assyrians out and added, "We should not let them return to their homelands". The ethnic-cleansing operation was coordinated by Enver, Talaat, and military and civilian Ottoman authorities. To legalize the invasion, the districts of Julamerk, Gawar, and Shemdinan were temporarily transferred to Mosul province. The Ottoman army joined local Kurdish tribes against specific targets. Suto Agha of the Kurdish Oramar tribe attacked Jilu, Dez, and Baz from the east; Said Agha attacked a valley in Lower Tyari; Ismael Agha targeted Chamba in Upper Tyari, and the Upper Berwar emir attacked Ashita, the Lizan valley, and Lower Tyari from the west.

=== Invasion of the highlands ===
The joint encirclement operation was launched on 11 June. The Jilu tribe was attacked at the beginning of the campaign by several Kurdish tribes; the fourth-century church of Mar Zaya, with historic artifacts, was destroyed. Ottoman forces based in Julamerk and Mosul launched a joint attack on Tyari on 23 June. Haydar first attacked the Tyari villages of Ashita and Sarespido; later, an expeditionary force of three thousand Turks and Kurds attacked the mountain pass between Tyari and Tkhuma. Although the Assyrians were victorious in most of the battles, they had unsustainable losses of lives and ammunition and lacked their invaders' German-manufactured rifles, machine guns, and artillery.

In July, Mar Shimun sent Malik Khoshaba and bishop Mar Yalda Yahwallah from Barwari to Tabriz in Persia to request urgent assistance from the Russians. The Kurdish Barzani tribe assisted the Ottoman army and laid waste to Tkhuma, Tyari, Jilu, and Baz. During the campaign, Ottoman forces took no prisoners. Mar Shimun's brother, Hormuz, was arrested while he was studying in Constantinople; in late June, Talaat tried to obtain the surrender of the Assyrian tribes by threatening Hormuz' life if Mar Shimun did not capitulate. The Assyrians refused, and he was killed.

Outnumbered and outgunned, the Assyrians retreated further into the high mountains without food and watched as their homes, farms, and herds were pillaged. They had no other option but fleeing to Persia, which most had done by September. Most of the men joined the Russian army, hoping to return home. During the 1915 fighting, the Assyrians' only strategic objective was defensive; the Ottoman goal was to defeat the Assyrian tribes and prevent their return.

== Ottoman occupation of Azerbaijan ==
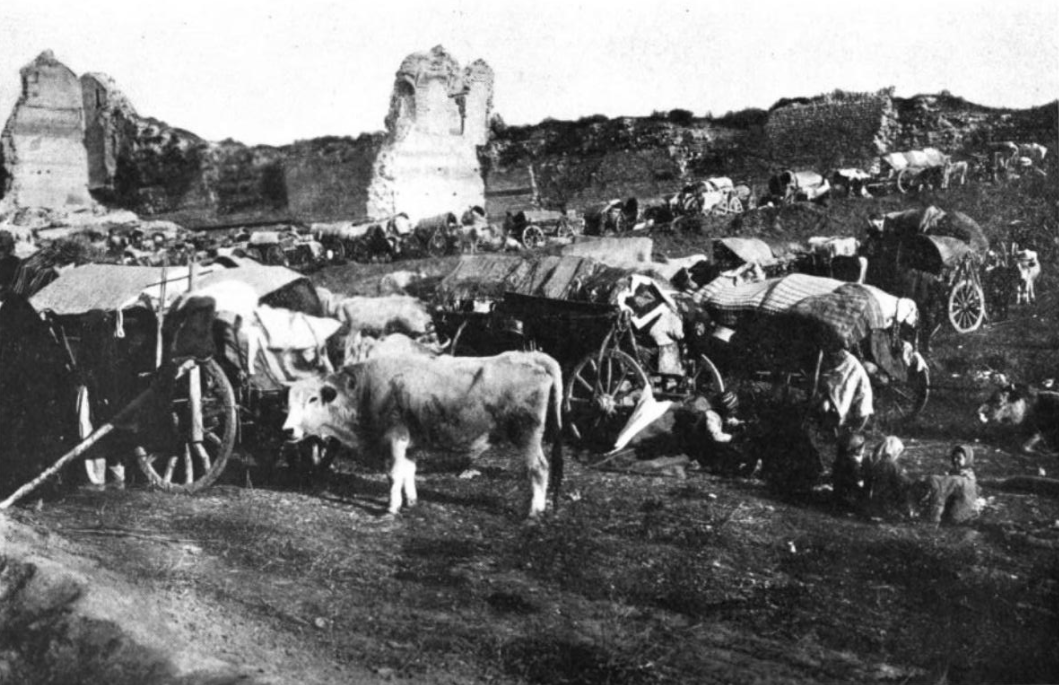
Christians fleeing to the Caucasus after the Russian withdrawal in January 1915

In 1903, Russia estimated that 31,700 Assyrians lived in Persia. Facing attacks from their Kurdish neighbors, the Assyrian villages in the Ottoman–Persian borderlands organized self-defense forces; by the outbreak of World War I, they were well armed. In 1914, before the declaration of war against Russia, Ottoman forces crossed the border into Persia and destroyed Christian villages. Large-scale attacks in late September and October 1914 targeted many Assyrian villages, and the attackers neared Urmia.

Due to Ottoman attacks, thousands of Christians living along the border fled to Urmia. Others arrived in Persia after fleeing from the Ottoman side of the border. The November 1914 proclamation of jihad by the Ottoman government inflamed jihadist sentiments in the Ottoman–Persian border area, convincing the local Kurdish population to side with the Ottomans. In November, Persia declared its neutrality; however, it was not respected by the warring parties.

Russia organized units of Assyrian and Armenian volunteers to bolster local Russian forces against Ottoman attack. Assyrians led by Agha Petros declared their support for the Entente, and marched in Urmia. Agha Petros later said that he had been promised by Russian officials that in exchange for their support, they would receive an independent state after the war. Ottoman irregulars in Van province crossed the Persian border, attacking Christian villages in Persia.

In response, Persia shut down the Ottoman consulates in Khoy, Tabriz, and Urmia and expelled Sunni Muslims. Ottoman authorities retaliated with the expulsion of several thousand Hakkari Assyrians to Persia. Resettled in farming villages, the Assyrians were armed by Russia. The Russian government was aware that the Assyrians and Armenians of Azerbaijan could not stop an Ottoman army, and was indifferent to the danger to which these communities would be exposed in an Ottoman invasion.

On 1 January 1915, Russia abruptly withdrew its forces. Ottoman forces led by Djevdet, Kazim Karabekir, and Ömer Naji occupied Azerbaijan with no opposition. Immediately after the withdrawal of Russian forces, local Muslims committed pogroms against Christians; the Ottoman army also attacked Christian civilians. Over a dozen villages were sacked and, of the large villages, only Gulpashan was left intact. News of the atrocities spread quickly, leading many Armenians and Assyrians to flee to the Russian Caucasus. Those north of Urmia had more time to flee. According to several estimates, about 10,000 or 15,000 to 20,000 crossed the border into Russia. Assyrians who had volunteered for the Russian forces were separated from their families, who were often left behind. An estimated 15,000 Ottoman troops reached Urmia by 4 or 5 January, and Dilman on 8 January.

=== Massacres ===
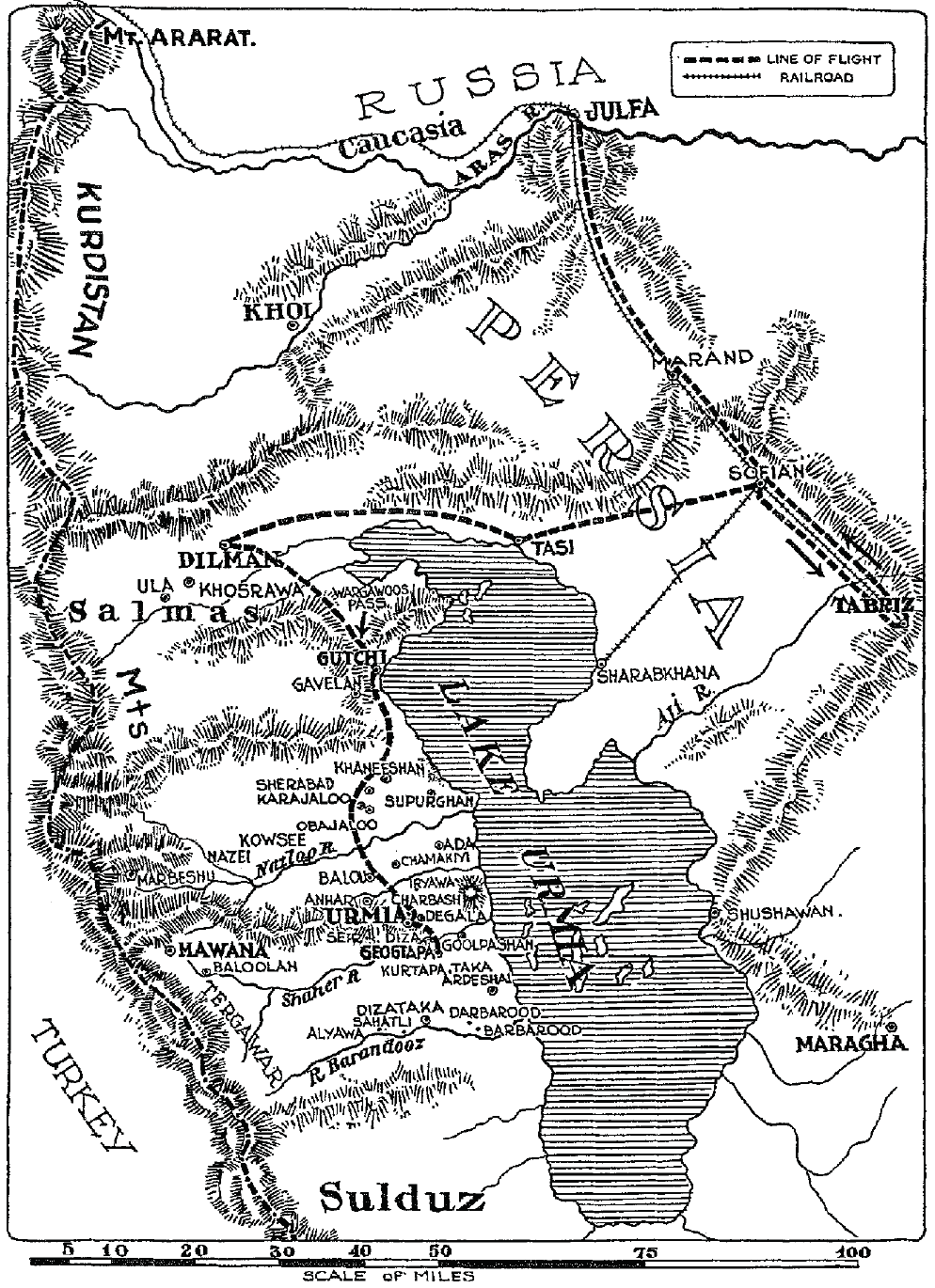
A map of the Sayfo in Azerbaijan, with destroyed Christian towns, and refugee escape routes

Ottoman troops began attacking Christian villages during their February 1915 retreat, when they were turned back by a Russian counterattack. Facing losses which they blamed on Armenian volunteers and imagining a broad Armenian rebellion, Djevdet ordered massacres of Christian civilians to reduce the potential future strength of volunteer units. Some local Kurdish tribes participated in the killings, but others protected Christian civilians. Some Assyrian villages also engaged in armed resistance when attacked. The Persian Ministry of Foreign Affairs protested the atrocities to the Ottoman government, but lacked the power to prevent them.

Many Christians did not have time to flee during the Russian withdrawal, and 20,000 to 25,000 refugees were stranded in Urmia. Nearly 18,000 Christians sought shelter in the city's Presbyterian and Lazarist missions. Although there was reluctance to attack the missionary compounds, many died of disease. Between February and May, when the Ottoman forces pulled out, there was a campaign of mass execution, looting, kidnapping, and extortion against Christians in Urmia. More than 100 men were arrested at the Lazarist compound, and dozens, including Mar Dinkha, bishop of Tergawer, were executed on 23 and 24 February. Near Urmia, the large Syriac village of Gulpashan was attacked; men were killed, and women and children were abducted and raped.

There were no missionaries in the Salmas valley to protect Christians, although some local Muslims tried to do so. In Dilman, the Persian governor offered shelter to 400 Christians; he was forced to surrender the men to Ottoman forces, however, who executed them in the town square. The Ottoman forces lured Christians to Haftevan, a village south of Dilman, by demanding that they register there, and arrested notable people in Dilman who were brought to the village for execution. Over two days in February, 700 to 800 people, including the entire male Christian population, was murdered in Haftevan. The killings were committed by the Ottoman army, led by Djevdet, and the local Shekak Kurdish tribe, led by Simko Shikak.

In April, Ottoman army commander Halil Pasha arrived in Azerbaijan with reinforcements from Rowanduz. Halil and Djevdet ordered the murder of Armenian and Syriac soldiers serving in the Ottoman army, and several hundred were killed. In several other massacres in Azerbaijan in early 1915, hundreds of Christians were killed and women were targeted for kidnapping and rape; seventy villages were destroyed. In May and June, Christians who had fled to the Caucasus returned to find their villages destroyed. Armenian and Assyrian volunteers attacked Muslims in revenge. After retreating from Persia, Ottoman forces—blaming Armenians and Assyrians for their defeat—took revenge against Ottoman Christians. Ottoman atrocities in Persia were widely covered by international media in mid-March 1915, prompting a declaration on 24 May by Russia, France, and the United Kingdom condemning them. The Blue Book, a collection of eyewitness reports of Ottoman atrocities published by the British government in 1916, devoted 104 of its 684 pages to the Assyrians.

== Butcher battalion in Bitlis ==
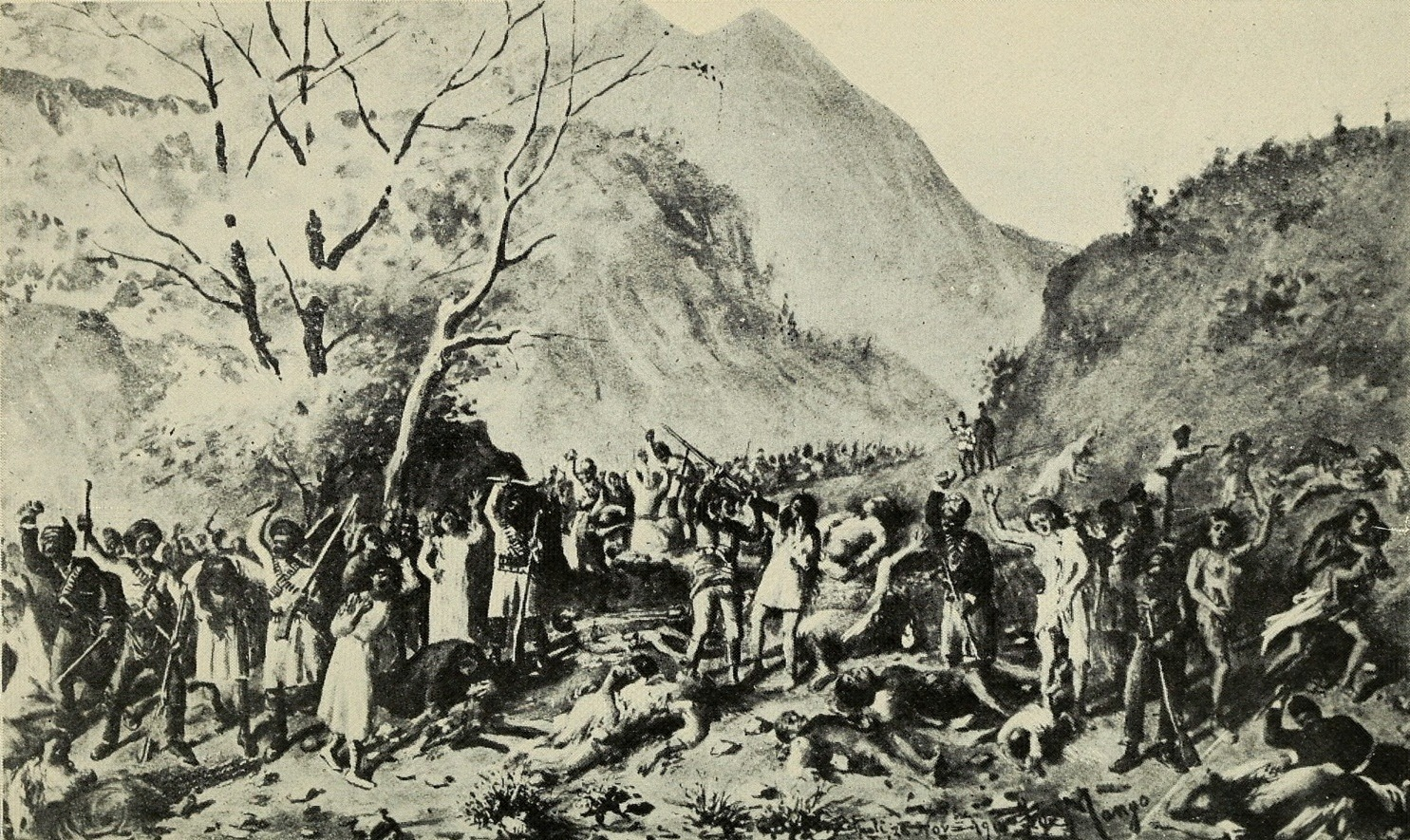
1920 painting by Leonardo de Mango of the execution of Chaldeans in the Wadi Wawela gorge

A Kurdish rebellion in Bitlis province was suppressed shortly before the outbreak of war in November 1914. The CUP government reversed its previous opposition to the Hamidiye regiments, recruiting them to put down the rebellion. As elsewhere, military requisitions became pillage; in February, labor-battalion recruits began to disappear. In July and August 1915, 2,000 Chaldeans and Syriac Orthodox from Bitlis were among those who fled to the Caucasus when the Russian army retreated from Van.

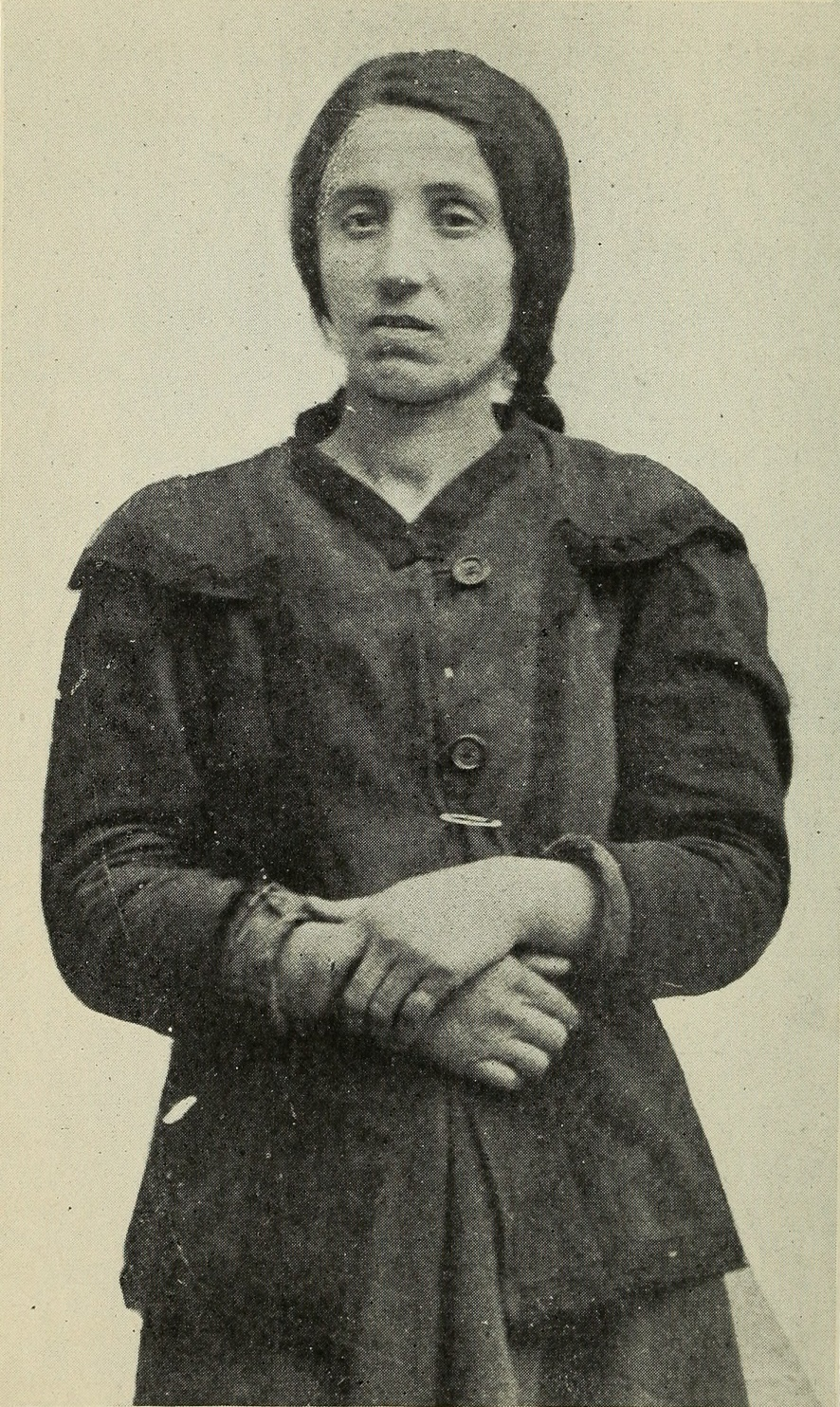
Djalila, a Chaldean Catholic woman who survived deportation from Siirt to Aleppo

Before the war, Siirt and the surrounding area were Christian enclaves populated largely by Chaldean Catholics. Catholic priest Jacques Rhétoré estimated that there were 60,000 Christians living in the Siirt district (sanjak), including 15,000 Chaldeans and 20,000 Syriac Orthodox. Violence in Siirt began on 9 June with the arrest and execution of Armenian, Syriac Orthodox, and Chaldean clerics and notable residents, including the Chaldean bishop Addai Sher.

After retreating from Persia, Djevdet led the siege of Van; he continued to Bitlis province in June with 8,000 soldiers, whom he called the "butcher battalion" (Turkish: kassablar taburu). The arrival of these troops in Siirt led to more violence. District governor (mutasarrif) Serfiçeli Hilmi Bey and Siirt mayor Abdul Ressak were replaced because they did not support the killing. Forty local officials in Siirt organized the massacres.

During the month-long massacre, Christians were killed in the streets or their houses (which were looted). The Chaldean diocese of Siirt was destroyed, including its library of rare manuscripts. The massacre was organized by Bitlis governor Abdülhalik Renda, the chief of police, the mayor, and other prominent local residents. The killing in Siirt was committed by çetes, and the surrounding villages were destroyed by Kurds; many local Kurdish tribes were involved. According to Venezuelan mercenary Rafael de Nogales, the massacre was planned as revenge for Ottoman defeats by Russia. De Nogales believed that Halil was trying to assassinate him, since the CUP had disposed of other witnesses. He left Siirt as quickly as he could, passing deportation columns of Syriac and Armenian women and children.

Only 400 people were deported from Siirt; the remainder were killed or kidnapped by Muslims. The deportees (women and children, since the men had been executed) were forced to march west from Siirt towards Mardin or south towards Mosul, assaulted by police. As they passed through, their possessions, including their clothes, were stolen by local Kurds and Turks. Those unable to keep up were killed. Women considered attractive were abducted by police or Kurds, raped, and killed. One site of attacks and robbery by Kurds was the gorge of Wadi Wawela in Sawro kaza, northeast of Mardin. No deportees reached Mardin, and only 50 to 100 Chaldeans (of an original 7,000 to 8,000) reached Mosul. Three Assyrian villages in Siirt—Dentas, Piroze and Hertevin—survived the Sayfo, existing until 1968 when their residents emigrated.

After leaving Siirt, Djevdet proceeded to Bitlis and arrived on 25 June. His forces killed men, and the women and girls were enslaved by Turks and Kurds. The Syriac Orthodox Church estimated its Bitlis province losses at 8,500, primarily in Schirwan and Garzan.

== Diyarbekir ==
The situation for Christians in Diyarbekir province worsened during the winter of 1914–1915; the Saint Ephraim church was vandalized, and four young men from the Syriac village of Qarabash (near Diyarbekir) were hanged for desertion. Syriacs who protested the executions were clubbed by police, and two died. In March, many non-Muslim soldiers were disarmed and transferred to road-building labor battalions. Harsh conditions, mistreatment, and individual murders led to many deaths.

On 25 March, CUP founding member Mehmed Reshid was appointed governor of Diyarbekir. Chosen for his record of anti-Armenian violence, Reshid brought thirty Special Organization members (mainly Circassians) who were joined by released convicts. Many local officials (kaymakams and district governors) refused to follow Reshid's orders, and were replaced in May and June 1915. Kurdish confederations were offered rewards to allow their Syriac clients to be killed. Government allies complied (including the Milli and Dekşuri), and many who had supported the anti-CUP 1914 Bedirhan revolt switched sides because the extermination of Christians did not threaten their interests. The Raman tribe became enthusiastic executioners for Reshid, but parts of the Heverkan leadership protected Christians; this limited Reshid's genocide, and allowed pockets of resistance to survive in Tur Abdin. Some Yazidis, who were also persecuted by the government, aided the Christians. The killers in Diyarbekir were typically volunteers organized by local leaders, and the freelance perpetrators took a share of the loot. Some women and children were abducted into local Kurdish or Arab families.

Thousands of Armenians and several hundred Syriacs (including all their clergymen) in Diyarbekir city were arrested, deported, and massacred in June. In the Viranşehir kaza, west of Mardin, its Armenians were massacred in late May and June 1915. Syriacs were not killed, but many lost their property and some were deported to Mardin in August. In total, 178 Syriac towns and villages near Diyarbekir were wiped out and most of them razed.

=== Targeting of non-Armenian Christians ===
Under Reshid's leadership, a systematic anti-Christian extermination was conducted in Diyarbekir province which included Syriacs and the province's few Greek Orthodox and Greek Catholics. Reshid knew that his decision to extend the persecution to all Christians in Diyarbekir was against the central government's wishes, and he concealed relevant information from his communications. Unlike the government, Reshid and his Mardin deputy Bedri Bey classified all Aramaic-speaking Christians as Armenians: enemies of the CUP who must be eliminated. Reshid planned to replace Diyarbekir's Christians with selected, approved Muslim settlers to counterbalance the potentially-rebellious Kurds; in practice, however, the areas were resettled by Kurds and the genocide consolidated the province's Kurdish presence. Historian Uğur Ümit Üngör says that in Diyarbekir, "most instances of massacre in which the militia engaged were directly ordered by" Reshid and "all Christian communities of Diyarbekir were equally hit by the genocide, although the Armenians were often particularly singled out for immediate destruction". The priest Jacques Rhétoré estimated that the Syriac Orthodox in Diyarbekir province lost 72 percent of their population, compared to 92 percent of Armenian Catholics and 97 percent of Armenian Apostolic Church adherents.

German diplomats noticed that the Ottoman deportations were targeting groups other than Armenians, leading to a complaint from the German government. Austria-Hungary and the Holy See also protested the violence against non-Armenians. Talaat Pasha telegraphed Reshid on 12 July 1915 that "measures adopted against the Armenians are absolutely not to be extended to other Christians ... you are ordered to put an immediate end to these acts". No action was taken against Reshid for exterminating Syriac Christians or assassinating Ottoman officials who disagreed with the massacres, however, and in 1916 he was appointed governor of Ankara. Talaat's telegram may have been sent in response to German and Austrian opposition to the massacres, with no expectation of implementation. The perpetrators began separating Armenians and Syriacs in early July, only killing the former; however, the killing of Syriacs resumed in August and September.

=== Mardin district ===
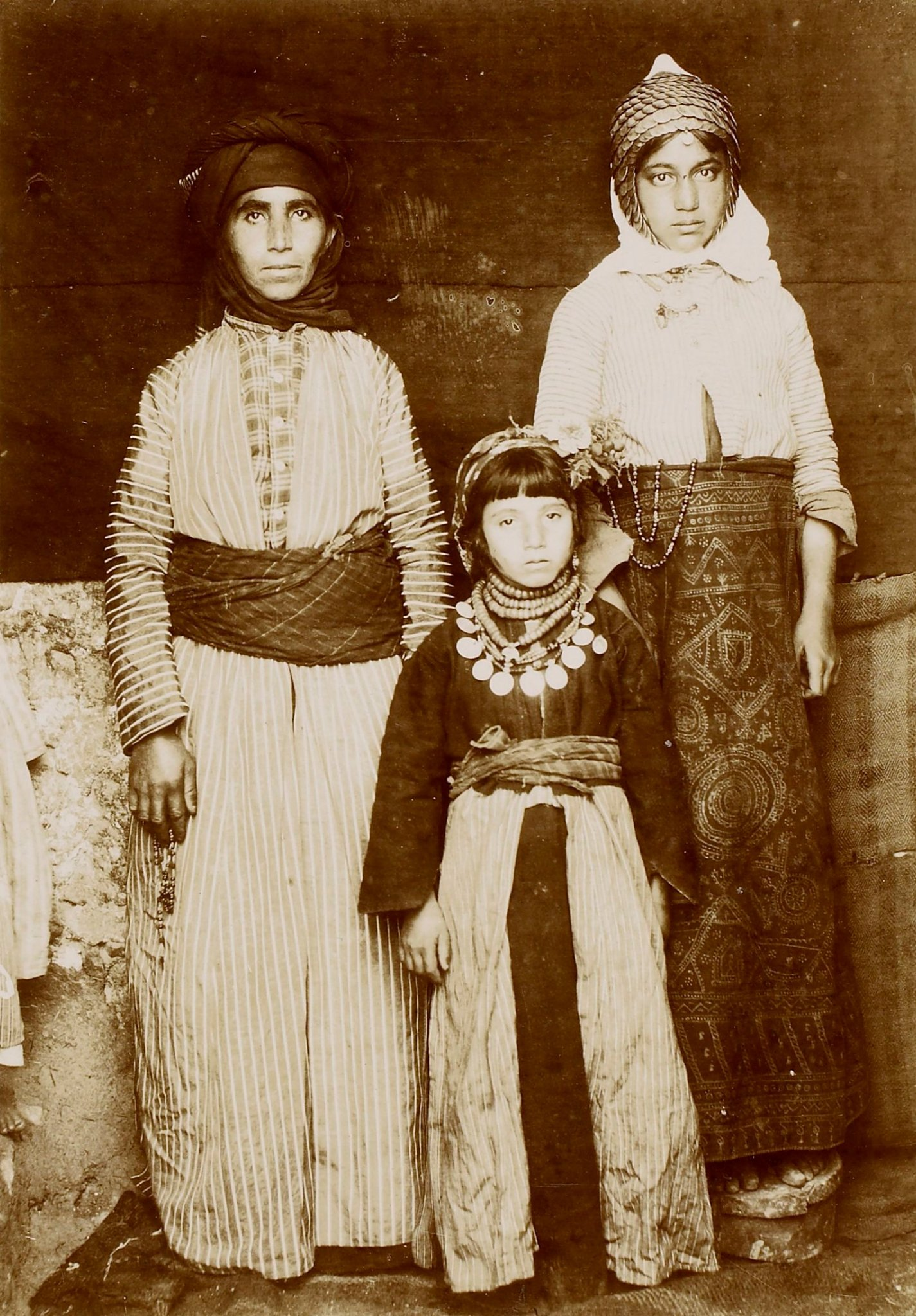
Syriac Orthodox family in Mardin, 1904

Christians in Mardin were largely untouched until May 1915. At the end of May, they heard about the abduction of Christian women and the murder of wealthy Christians elsewhere in Diyarbekir to steal their property. Extortion and violence began in Mardin district, despite the efforts of district governor Hilmi Bey. Hilmi rejected Reshid's demands to arrest Christians in Mardin, saying that they posed no threat to the state. Reshid sent Pirinççizâde Aziz Feyzi to incite anti-Christian violence in April and May, and Feyzi bribed or persuaded the Deşi, Mışkiye, Kiki and Helecan chieftains to join him. Mardin police chief Memduh Bey arrested dozens of men in early June, using torture to extract confessions of treason and disloyalty and extorting money from their families. Reshid appointed a new mayor and officials in Mardin, who organized a 500-man militia to kill. He also urged the central government to depose Hilmi, which it did on 8 June. He was replaced by the equally-resistant Shefik, whom Reshid also tried to depose. The cooperative Ibrahim Bedri was appointed as an official and Reshid used him to carry out his orders, bypassing Shefik. Reshid also replaced Midyat governor Nuri Bey with the hardline Edib Bey in July 1915, after Nuri refused to cooperate with Reshid.

On the night of 26 May, militiamen were caught attempting to plant arms in a Syriac Catholic church in Mardin. Their intent was to cite the supposed discovery of an arms cache as evidence of a Christian rebellion to justify the planned massacres. Mardin's well-to-do Christians were deported in convoys, the first of which left the city on 10 June. Those who refused to convert to Islam were murdered on the road to Diyarbekir. Half of the second convoy, which departed on 12 June, had been massacred before messengers from Diyarbekir announced that the non-Armenians had been pardoned by the sultan; they were subsequently freed. Other convoys from Mardin were targeted for extermination from late June until October. The city's Syriac Orthodox made a deal with authorities and were spared, but the other Christian denominations were decimated.

All Christian denominations were treated the same in the Mardin district countryside. Militia and Kurds attacked the village of Tell Ermen on 1 July, killing men, women, and children indiscriminately in the church after raping the women. The next day, more than 1,000 Syriac Orthodox and Catholics were massacred in Eqsor by militia and Kurds from the Milli, Deşi, Mişkiye, and Helecan tribes. Looting continued for several days before the village was burned down (which could be seen from Mardin). In Nusaybin, Talaat's order to spare the Syriacs was ignored as Christians of all denominations (including many Syriac Orthodox Church members) were arrested in mid-August and murdered in a ravine. In Djezire (Cizre) kaza, Syriac Orthodox leader Gabro Khaddo cooperated with the authorities, defused plans for armed resistance, and paid a large ransom in June 1915; almost all Syriacs were killed with the kaza's Armenians at the end of August. Some Armenian and Syriac Orthodox men were drafted to work in road construction or harvesting crops in place of those who had been killed. In August 1915, the harvest was over; the Armenians were killed, and the Syriacs were released.

==== Tur Abdin ====
Old Midyat in 2013

In Tur Abdin, some Syriac Christians fought their attempted extermination. This was considered treason by Ottoman officials, who reported massacre victims as rebels. Christians in Midyat considered resistance after hearing about massacres elsewhere, but the local Syriac Orthodox community initially refused to support this. On 21 June, 100 men (mostly Armenians and Protestants) were arrested, tortured for confessions implicating others, and executed outside the city; this panicked the Syriac Orthodox. Local people refused to hand over their arms, attacked government offices, and cut telegraph lines; local Arab and Kurdish tribes were recruited to attack the Christians. The town was pacified in early August after weeks of bloody urban warfare which killed hundreds of Christians. Survivors fled east to the more-defensible Iwardo, which held out successfully with the food aid of local Yazidis.

In June 1915, many Syriacs from Midyat kaza were massacred; others fled to the hills. A month earlier, local tribes and the Ramans began attacking Christian villages near Azakh (present-day İdil) on the road from Midyat to Djezire. Survivors fled to Azakh, since it was defensible. The villages were attacked from north to south, giving the attackers at Azakh (one of the southernmost villages) more time to prepare. The primarily Syriac Orthodox village refused to hand over Catholics and Protestants, as demanded by the authorities. Azakh was first attacked on 17 or 18 August, but the defenders repelled this and subsequent attacks over the next three weeks.

Against the advice of General Mahmud Kâmil Pasha, Enver ordered the rebellion suppressed in November. Parts of the Third, Fourth, and Sixth Armies and a Turkish–German expeditionary force under Max Erwin von Scheubner-Richter and Ömer Naji were sent to crush the rebels, the latter diverted from attacking Tabriz. To justify the attack on Azakh, Ottoman officials claimed (with no evidence) that Armenian rebels had "cruelly massacred the Muslim population of the region". Scheubner, skeptical of the attack, forbade any Germans from participating. German general Colmar Freiherr von der Goltz and the German ambassador in Constantinople, Konstantin von Neurath, informed Chancellor Theobald von Bethmann Hollweg of the Ottoman request for German assistance in crushing the resistance. The Germans refused, fearing that the Ottomans would insinuate that the Germans initiated the anti-Christian atrocities. The defenders launched a surprise attack on Ottoman troops during the night of 13–14 November, which led to a truce (lobbied by the Germans) which ended the resistance on favorable terms for the villagers. On 25 December 1915, the Ottoman government decreed that "instead of deporting all of the Syriac people", they were to be confined "in their present locations". Most of Tur Abdin was in ruins by this time, except for villages which resisted and families who found refuge in monasteries. Other Syriacs had fled south, into present-day Syria and Iraq.

== Aftermath ==
=== Ethnic violence in Azerbaijan ===
External image
- Les Assyriens et les Assyro-Chaldéens sur les routes de l’exil, 1915–1935.

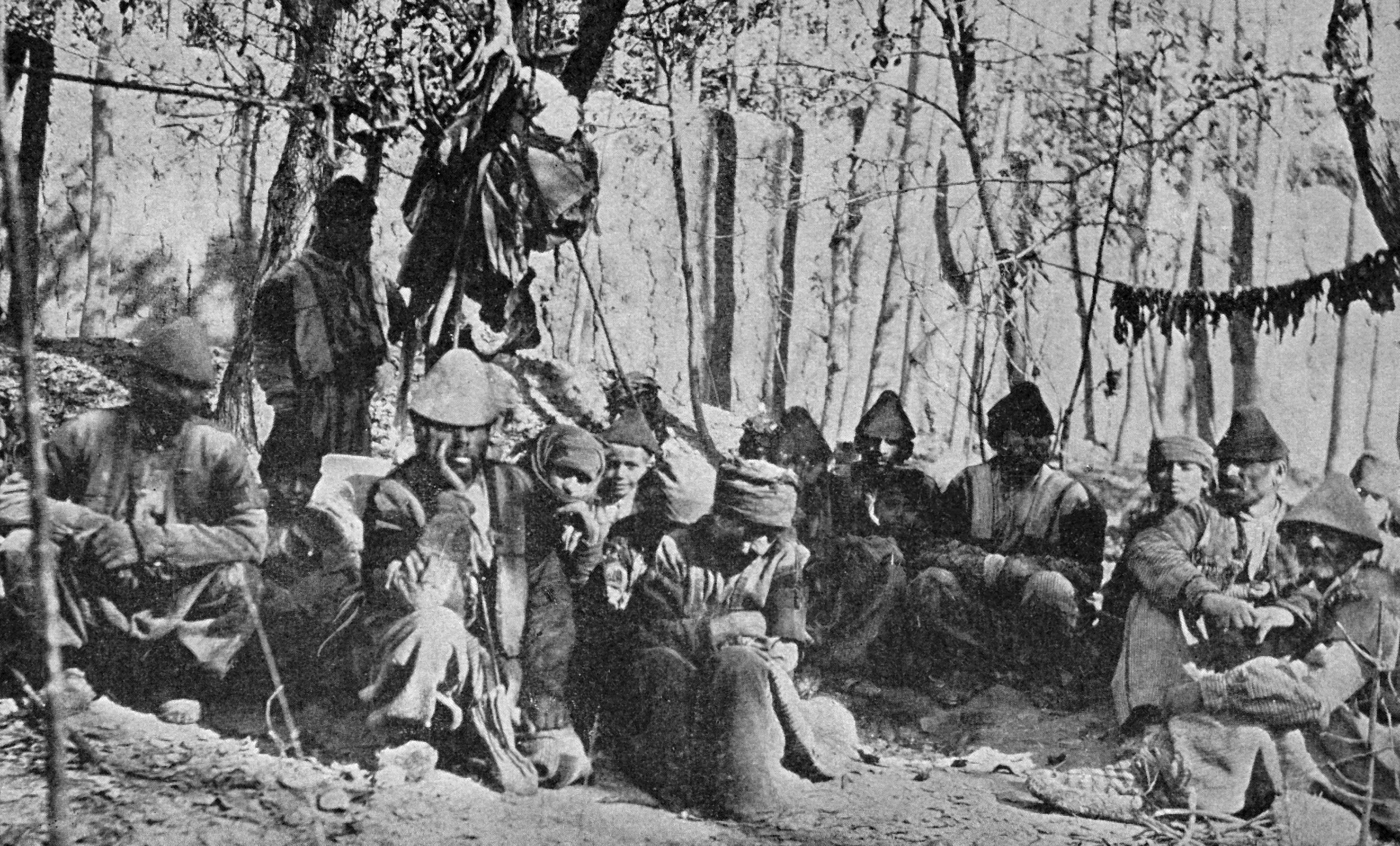
Assyrian refugees from Tyari and Tkhuma near Urmia in late 1915

After their expulsion from Hakkari, the Assyrians and their herds were resettled by Russian occupation authorities near Khoy, Salmas and Urmia. Many died during the first winter due to lack of food, shelter, and medical care, and they were resented by local residents for worsening living standards. Assyrian men from Hakkari offered their services to the Russian military; although their knowledge of local terrain was useful, they were poorly disciplined. In 1917, Russia's withdrawal from the war after the Russian Revolution dimmed prospects of a return to Hakkari. About 5,000 Assyrian and Armenian militia policed the area, but they frequently abused their power and killed Muslims without provocation.

From February to July 1918, the region was engulfed by ethnic violence. On 22 February, local Muslims and the Persian governor began an uprising against the Christian militias in Urmia. The better-organized Christians, led by Agha Petros, brutally crushed the uprising; hundreds (possibly thousands) were killed. On 16 March, Mar Shimun and many of his bodyguards were killed by the Kurdish chieftain Simko Shikak, probably at the instigation of Persian officials fearing Assyrian separatism, after they met to discuss an alliance. Assyrians went on a killing and looting spree; unable to find Simko, they murdered Persian officials and inhabitants. The Kurds responded by massacring Christians, regardless of denomination or ethnicity. Christians were massacred in Salmas in June and in Urmia in early July, and many Assyrian women were abducted.

Christian militias in Azerbaijan were no match for the Ottoman army when it invaded in July 1918. Tens of thousands of Ottoman and Persian Assyrians fled south to Hamadan, where the British Dunsterforce was garrisoned, on 18 July to escape Ottoman forces approaching Urmia under Ali İhsan Sâbis. The Ottoman invasion was followed by killings of Christians, including Chaldean archbishop Toma Audo, and the sacking of Urmia. Some remained in Persia, but there was another anti-Christian massacre on 24 May 1919. Historian Florence Hellot-Bellier says that the interethnic violence of 1918 and 1919 "demonstrate[s] the degree of violence and resentment which had accumulated throughout all of these years of war and the break-up of the long-standing links between the inhabitants of the Urmia region". According to Gaunt, Assyrian "victims, when given the chance, turned without hesitation into perpetrators".

=== Exile in Iraq ===
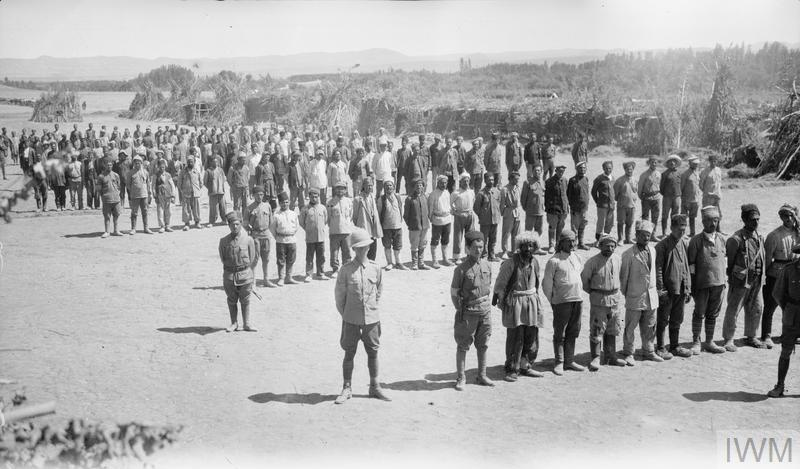
Jilu Assyrian recruits drilled by British soldiers in Hamadan, 1918

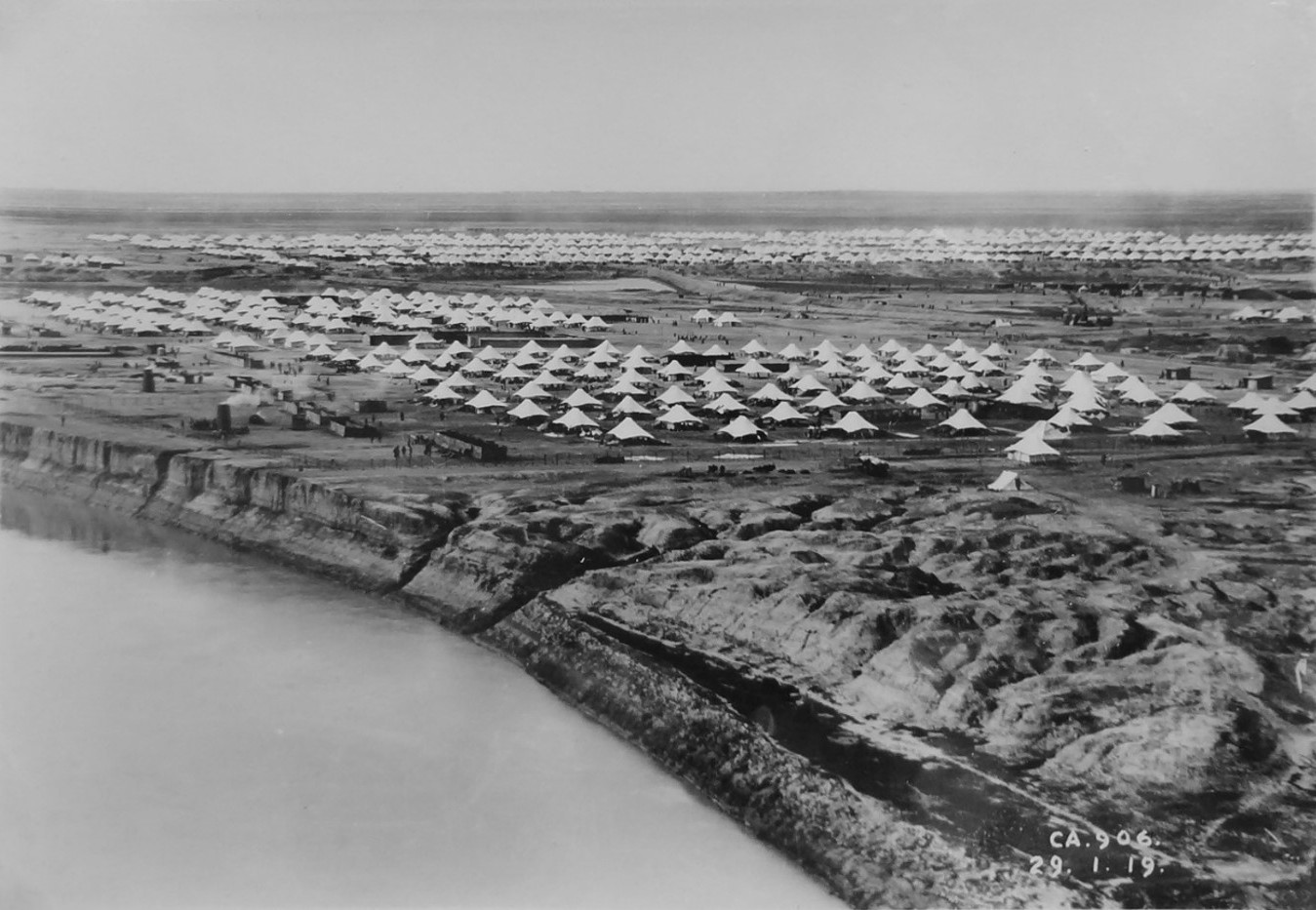
Baqubah camp around 1920

During the journey to Hamadan, the Assyrians were harassed by Kurdish irregulars (probably at the instigation of Simko and Sayyid Taha); some died of exhaustion. Many were killed near Heydarabad, and another 5,000 during an ambush by Ottoman forces and Kurdish irregulars near the Sahin Ghal'e mountain pass. Dependent on the British for protection, they were resettled in a refugee camp in Baqubah (near Baghdad) which held fifteen thousand Armenians and thirty-five thousand Assyrians in October 1918. Conditions at the camp were poor, and an estimated 7,000 Assyrians died there. Although the United Kingdom requested that Assyrian refugees be allowed to return, the Persian government refused.

In 1920, the camp in Baqubah was shut down and Assyrians hoping to return to Azerbaijan or Hakkari were sent northwards to Midan. About 4,500 Assyrians were resettled near Duhok and Akre in northern Iraq. They worked as soldiers for the British rulers of Mandatory Iraq, which backfired when the British did not follow through with their repeated promises to resettle Assyrians in areas where they would be safer. After the end of the mandate, Assyrians were killed in the 1933 Simele massacre. After the massacre, France allowed 24,000 to 25,000 Assyrians to resettle along the Khabur in northeastern Syria. Other Assyrians were exiled in the Caucasus, Russia, or Lebanon, and a few immigrated to the United States, Canada, South America, and Europe.

=== Assyrians in Turkey ===
A few thousand Assyrians remained in Hakkari after 1915, and others returned after the war. Armed by the British, Agha Petros led a group of Assyrians from Tyari and Tkhuma who wanted to return in 1920; he was repulsed by Barwari chieftain Rashid Bek and the Turkish army. The remaining Assyrians were driven out again in 1924 by a Turkish army commanded by Kazim Karabekir, and the mountains were depopulated. In Siirt, Islamicized Syriacs (primarily women) were left behind. Their Kurdified (or Arabized) descendants still live there.

The survivors lost access to their property, becoming landless agricultural laborers, or later, an urban underclass. The depopulated Christian villages were resettled by Kurds or Muslims from the Caucasus. During and after the genocide, more than 150 churches and monasteries were demolished. Others were converted to mosques or other uses. Many manuscripts and cultural objects were destroyed.

After 1923, local politicians went on an anti-Christian campaign which negatively impacted the Syriac communities (such as Adana, Urfa or Adiyaman) unaffected by the 1915 genocide. Many were forced to abandon their property and flee to Syria, eventually settling in Aleppo, Qamishli, or the Khabur region. Despite its effort to court the Turkish nationalists, including denying that Syriac Orthodox had been persecuted during the war, the Syriac Orthodox patriarchate was expelled from Turkey in 1924. Unlike the Armenians, Jews, and Greeks, Assyrians were not recognized as a minority group in the 1923 Treaty of Lausanne.

The remaining population lived in submission to Kurdish aghas, subject to harassment and abuse which drove them to emigrate. Turkish laws denaturalized those who had fled and confiscated their property. Despite their citizenship rights, many Assyrians who remained in Turkey had to re-purchase their property from Kurdish aghas or risk losing their Turkish citizenship. A substantial number of Assyrians continued to live in Tur Abdin until the 1980s. Some scholars have described the ongoing exclusion and harassment of Assyrians in Turkey as a continuation of the Sayfo.

=== Paris Peace Conference ===
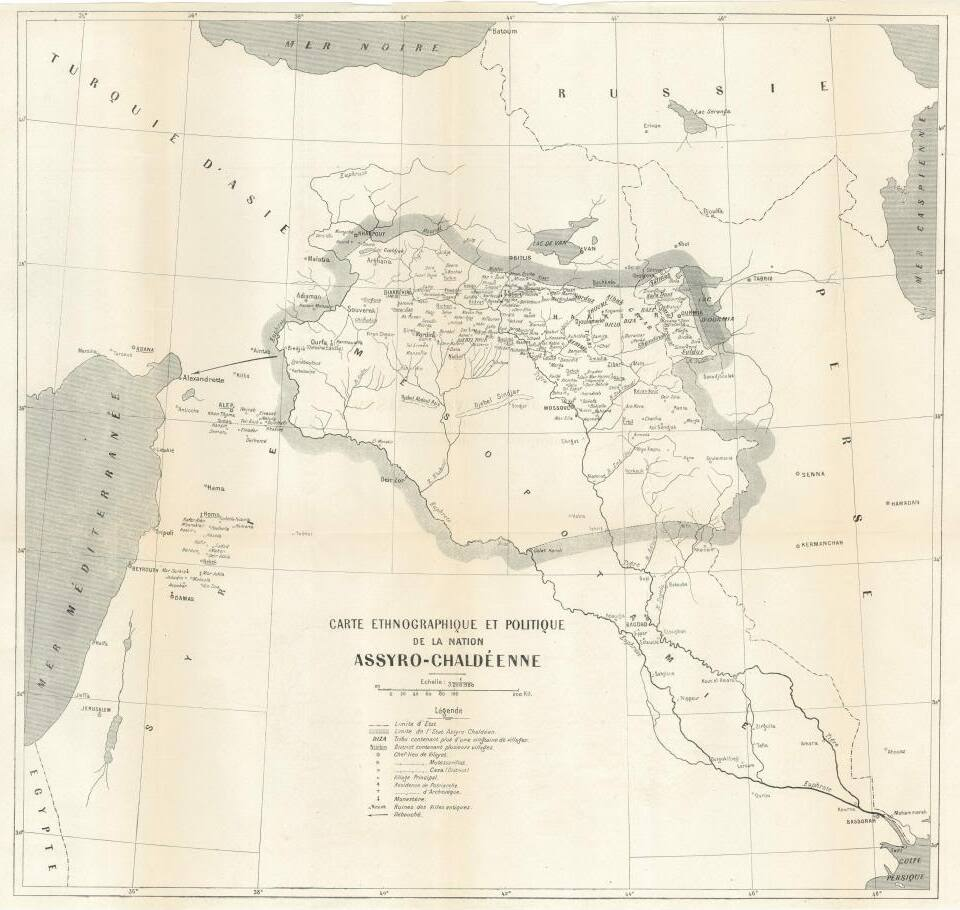
The Assyro-Chaldean delegation's map of an independent Assyria, presented at the Paris Peace Conference, 1919

In 1919, Assyrians attended the Paris Peace Conference and attempted to lobby for compensation for their war losses. Although it has been labeled "the Assyrian delegation" in historiography, it was neither an official delegation nor a cohesive entity. Many attendees demanded monetary reparations for their war losses and an independent state, and all emphasized that Assyrians could not live under Muslim rule. Territory claimed by the Assyrians included parts of present-day Turkey, Iraq, and Iran.

Although there was considerable sympathy for the Assyrians, none of their demands were met. The British and the French had other plans for the Middle East, and the rising Turkish nationalist movement was also an obstacle. The Assyrians recalled that the British had promised them an independent country in exchange for their support, although it is disputed if such a promise was ever made; many Assyrians felt betrayed that this desire was not fulfilled.

== Death toll ==
Assyrian delegates at the Paris Peace Conference said that their losses were 250,000 in the Ottoman Empire and Persia, around half of the prewar population. In 1923, at the Lausanne Conference, they raised their estimate to 275,000. The source of these numbers is unknown and, according to Gaunt, their accuracy has been impossible to verify and the Assyrian delegation had an incentive to exaggerate. Although more than 50 percent of the population was killed in some areas, Assyrian communities in present-day Syria and Iraq were left mainly intact. The Sayfo was less systematic than the Armenian genocide; all Christians were killed in some places, but local officials spared Assyrians and targeted Armenians in others.

Losses, according to the Assyro-Chaldean delegation at the Paris Peace Conference
Region	Losses	Notes
Persia	40,000	Gaunt says that this number is probably an overestimate, and there is no reliable figure. According to historian Donald Bloxham, "perhaps 7,000 Persian Assyrians" were killed in 1915. A German observer estimated that 21,000 Christians were killed in Azerbaijan between December 1914 and February 1915.
Van (including Hakkari)	80,000	According to Gaunt, "This is a very high figure and should be treated with caution". Russian consul Basil Nikitin estimated that 45,000 Assyrians from Hakkari fled to Persia, out of more than 70,000 prewar residents.
Diyarbekir	63,000	Catholic priest Jacques Rhétoré estimated that 60,725 Syriac Orthodox, 10,010 Chaldeans, 3,450 Syriac Catholics, and 500 Protestants were killed, of 144,185 total Christian deaths in Diyarbekir. British Army officer Edward Noel estimated 96,000 Syriac Orthodox, 7,000 Chaldeans, 2,000 Syriac Catholics, and 1,200 Protestants out of 157,000 Christian deaths.
Harput	15,000	According to historian Raymond Kévorkian, Assyrians were spared from deportation from Harput; Gaunt says that the Armenian genocide in Harput became a Christian one.
Bitlis	38,000	Rhétoré estimated that before the war, 60,000 Christians lived in Siirt district (including 15,000 Chaldeans and 20,000 Syriac Orthodox). The Syriac Orthodox Church estimated its losses at 8,500 in the province.
Adana, Der Zor and elsewhere	5,000	Gaunt lists Adana as a place where the Assyrian population was untouched by the Sayfo.
Urfa	9,000	Gaunt also lists Urfa as a place where the Assyrian population was not affected by the Sayfo.
Total	250,000	—

== Legacy ==
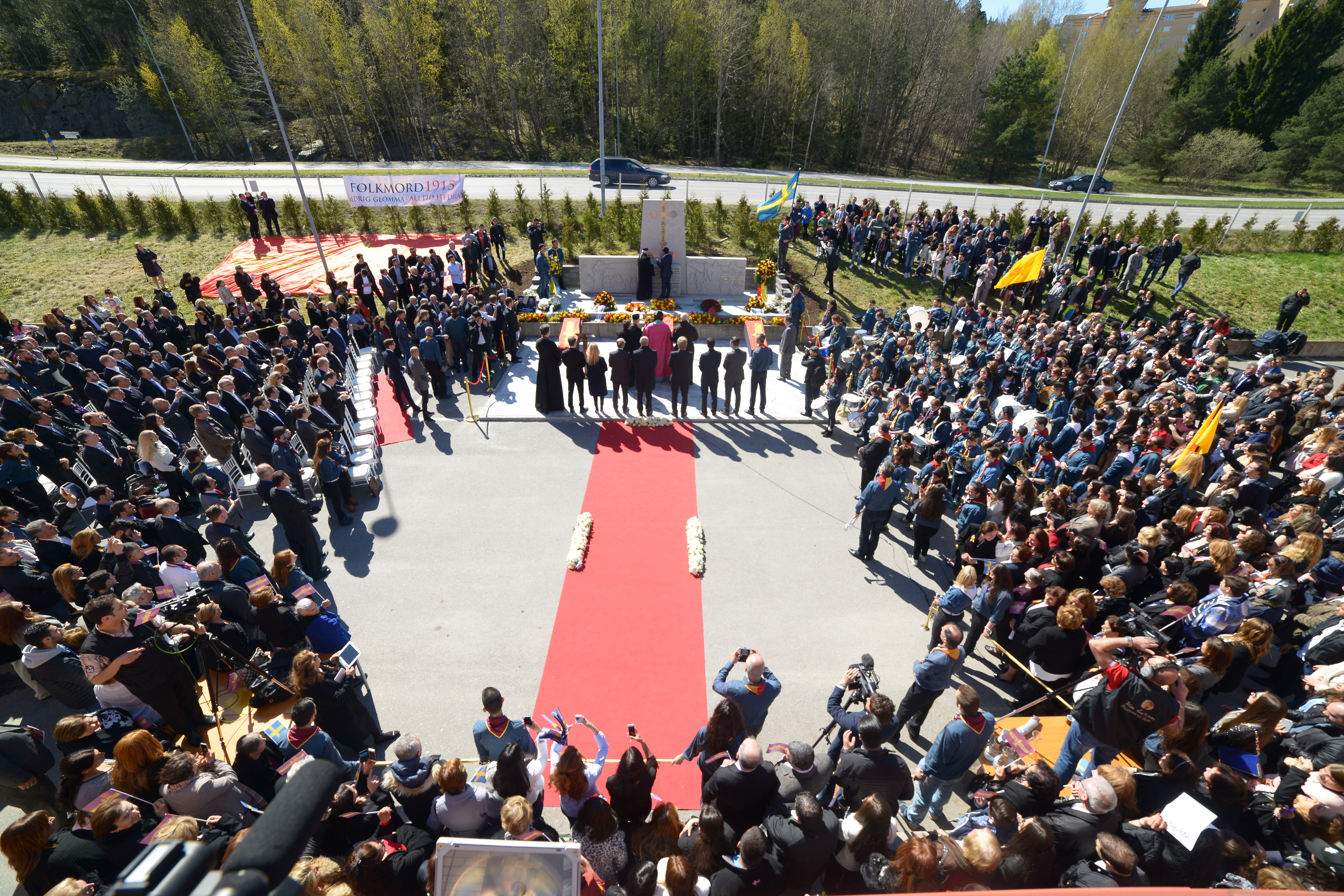
Memorial ceremony in Sweden's Botkyrka Municipality, 26 April 2015

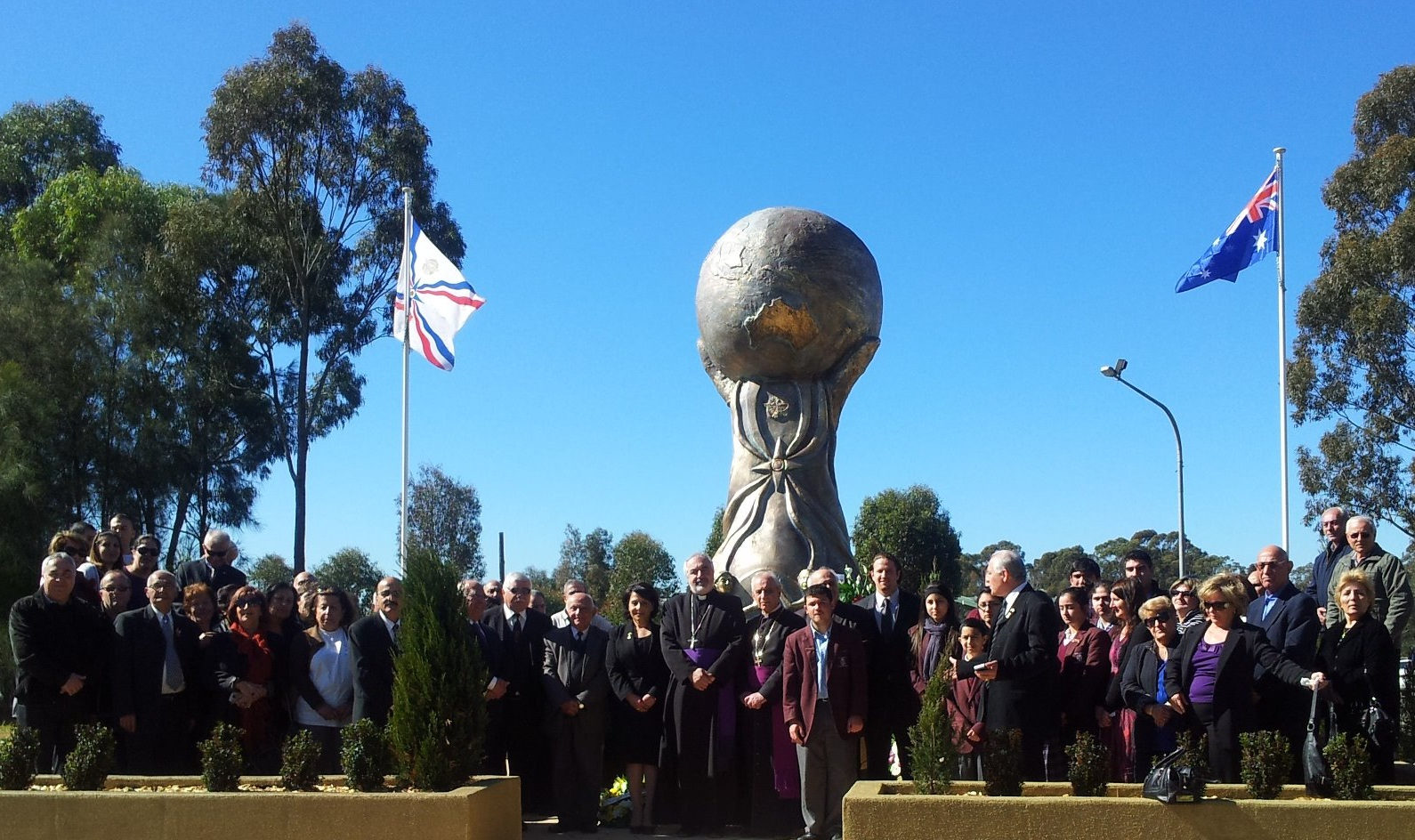
Sayfo monument in Fairfield, Australia

For Assyrians, the Sayfo is considered the greatest modern example of their persecution. Eyewitness accounts of the genocide were typically passed down orally, rather than in writing; memories were often passed down in lamentations. After large-scale migration to Western countries (where Assyrians had greater freedom of speech) during the second half of the twentieth century, accounts began to be communicated more publicly by grandchildren of survivors.

The Turkish government denies that the Sayfo was a genocide; unlike its denial of the Armenian genocide, however, it prefers to avoid the issue. After the 1915 genocide, the Turkish government initially silenced its discussion in high culture and written works. Non-Turkish music and poetry were suppressed, and the Syriac Orthodox Church discouraged discussion of the Sayfo for fear of reprisals from the Turkish government.

The Sayfo is less well known than the Armenian genocide, partially because its targets were divided among mutually-antagonistic churches and did not develop a collective identity. During the 1990s, before the first academic research on the Sayfo, Assyrian diaspora groups (inspired by campaigns for Armenian genocide recognition) began to press for a similar formal acknowledgement. In parallel with the political campaign, Armenian genocide research began to include Assyrians as victims. In December 2007, the International Association of Genocide Scholars passed a resolution recognizing the Assyrian genocide. The Sayfo is also recognized as a genocide in resolutions passed by Sweden (in 2010), Armenia (2015), the Netherlands (2015), and Germany (in 2016). Memorials in Armenia, Australia, Belgium, France, Greece, Sweden, Ukraine, and the United States commemorate victims of the Sayfo.
