= David Gaunt =

Historian and professor (born 1944)

David Gaunt (born 1944 in London) is a historian and professor at Södertörn University's Centre for Baltic and East European Studies and Member of Academia Europaea. Gaunt's book about the Assyrian genocide, Massacres, Resistance, Protectors, was described as "the most important book that has been published in recent years".

== Works ==
- Gaunt, David (1982). Memoir on History and Anthropology. Swedish Research Councils Publishing House. ISBN 978-91-86362-00-3.
- Gaunt, David (1983). Familjeliv i Norden (in Swedish). Gidlund. ISBN 978-91-7021-434-9.
- "The property and kin relationships of retired farmers in northern and central Europe" in Family forms in historic Europe, 1983
- Gaunt, David (1987). "Rural Household Organization and Inheritance in Northern Europe". Journal of Family History. 12 (1–3): 121–141. doi:10.1177/036319908701200107. S2CID 145793152.
- Gaunt, David, ed. (2004). Collaboration and Resistance During the Holocaust: Belarus, Estonia, Latvia, Lithuania. Peter Lang. ISBN 978-3-03910-245-7.
- Gaunt, David (2006). Massacres, Resistance, Protectors: Muslim-Christian Relations in Eastern Anatolia During World War I. Gorgias Press. ISBN 978-1-59333-301-0.
- Gaunt, David (2009). Beth-Zabday: vad hände 1915? [Beth-Zabday: What Happened in 1915?] (in Swedish). Azret Azech. ISBN 978-91-88328-53-3.
- Gaunt, David (2010). "Identity conflicts among Oriental Christian in Sweden". Sens Public. doi:10.7202/1064038ar.
- Gaunt, David (2010). "Reichskommissariat Ostland". The Routledge History of the Holocaust. Routledge Handbooks Online. doi:10.4324/9780203837443.ch19. ISBN 978-0-415-77956-2.
- "The Ottoman Treatment of the Assyrians" In: A Question of Genocide: Armenians and Turks at the End of the Ottoman Empire / [ed] Ronald Grigor Suny, Fatma Müge Göçek, Norman M. Naimark, Oxford: Oxford University Press, 2011, p. 244-259
- Gaunt, David (2012). "Relations between Kurds and Syriacs and Assyrians in Late Ottoman Diyarbekir". The Ottoman Empire and its Heritage, Volume: 51. pp. 241–266.
- "Failed Identity and the Assyrian Genocide" In: Shatterzone of Empires: Coexistence and Violence in the German, Habsburg, Russian and Ottoman Borderlands / [ed] Omer Bartov & Eric D. Weitz, Bloomington, Indiana: Indiana University Press, 2013, 1, p. 317-333
- "The Culture of Inter-Religious Violence in Anatolian Borderlands in the Late Ottoman Empire" In: Gewaltgemeinschaften: Von der Spätantike bis ins 20. Jahrhundert / [ed] Winfried Speitkamp, Göttingen: V&R Unipress, 2013, 1, p. 251-274
- Gaunt, David (2015). "The Complexity of the Assyrian Genocide". Genocide Studies International. 9 (1): 83–103. doi:10.3138/gsi.9.1.05. S2CID 129899863.
- Gaunt, David; Atto, Naures; Barthoma, Soner O., eds. (2017). Let Them Not Return: Sayfo – The Genocide Against the Assyrian, Syriac, and Chaldean Christians in the Ottoman Empire. Berghahn Books. ISBN 978-1-78533-499-3.
- Gaunt, David (2018). "Two Documents on the 1895 Massacres of Syriacs in the Province of Diyarbekir: A Discussion". Études arméniennes contemporaines (10): 187–201. doi:10.4000/eac.1592.
- "The Long Assyrian Genocide" in Collective and State Violence in Turkey: The Construction of a National Identity from Empire to Nation-State 2020
