= 20th century =

One hundred years, from 1901 to 2000

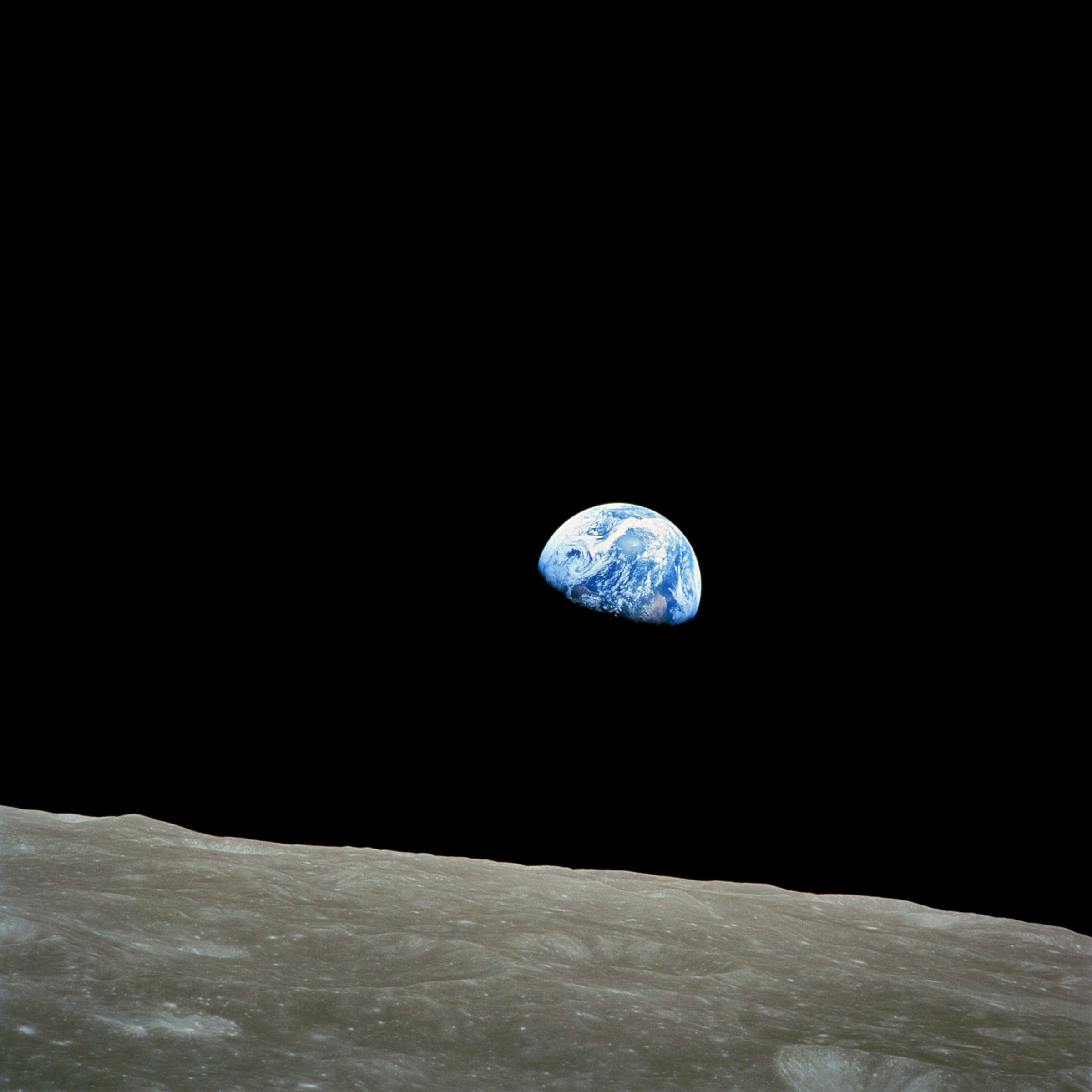
Earthrise, taken on 24 December 1968 by the American astronaut William Anders during the Apollo 8 space mission. It is the first photograph taken of Earth from lunar orbit.

The 20th century began on 1 January 1901, and ended on 31 December 2000. It was the 10th and last century in the 2nd millennium and was marked by new models of scientific understanding, unprecedented scopes of warfare, new modes of communication that would operate at nearly instant speeds, and new forms of art and entertainment. Population growth was also unprecedented, as the century started with around 1.6 billion people, and ended with around 6.2 billion.

The 20th century was dominated by significant geopolitical events that reshaped the political and social structure of the globe: World War I (including the Spanish flu pandemic), World War II and the Cold War. Unprecedented advances in science and technology defined the century, including the advent of nuclear weapons and nuclear power, space exploration, the shift from analog to digital computing and the continuing advancement of transportation, including powered flight and the car. The Earth's sixth mass extinction event, the Holocene extinction, continued, and human conservation efforts increased.

Major themes of the century included decolonization, nationalism, globalization and new forms of intergovernmental organizations. Democracy spread, and women gained the right to vote in many countries in the world. Cultural homogenization began through developments in emerging transportation and information and communications technology, with popular music and other influences of Western culture, international corporations, and what is arguably a truly global economy by the end of the 20th century. Poverty was reduced and the century saw rising standards of living, world population growth, awareness of environmental degradation and ecological extinction. Cars, airplanes, and home appliances became common, and video and audio recording saw mass adoption. These developments were made possible by the exploitation of fossil fuel resources, which offered energy in an easily portable form, but also caused concern about pollution and long-term impact on the environment. Humans started to explore space, taking their first footsteps on the Moon. Great advances in electricity generation and telecommunications allowed for near-instantaneous worldwide communication, ultimately leading to the Internet. Meanwhile, advances in medical technology resulted in the near-eradication and eradication of many infectious diseases, as well as opening the avenue of biological genetic engineering. Scientific discoveries, such as the theory of relativity and quantum physics, profoundly changed the foundational models of physical science, forcing scientists to realize that the universe is more complex than previously believed, and dashing the hopes (or fears) at the end of the 19th century that the last few details of scientific knowledge were about to be filled in.

== Summary ==
At the beginning of the period, the British Empire was the world's most powerful nation, having acted as the world's policeman for the past century.

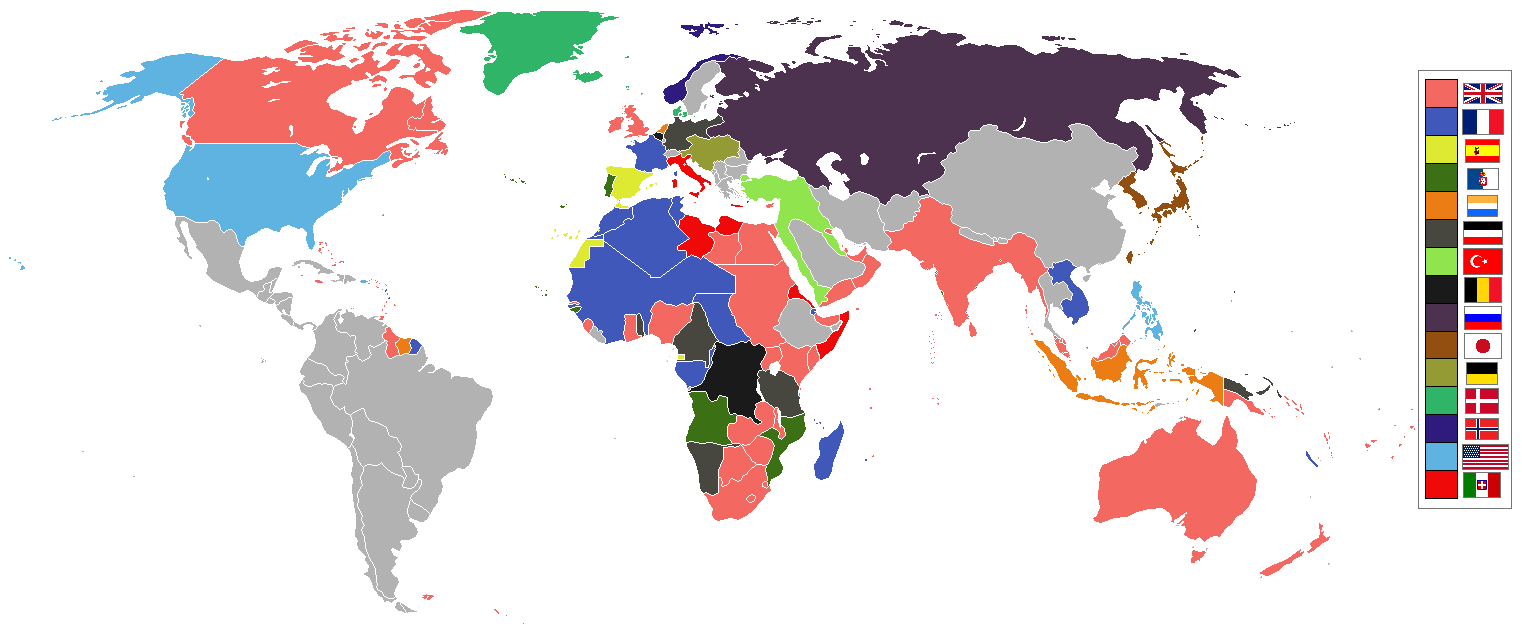
World powers and empires in 1914, just before the First World War.

Technological advancements during World War I changed the way war is now fought, as new inventions such as tanks, chemical weapons, and aircraft modified tactics and strategy. After more than four years of trench warfare in Western Europe, and up to 17 million dead, the powers that had formed the Triple Entente (France, Britain, and Russia, later replaced by the United States and joined by Italy and Romania) emerged victorious over the Central Powers (Germany, Austria-Hungary, the Ottoman Empire and Bulgaria). In addition to annexing many of the colonial possessions of the vanquished states, the Triple Entente exacted punitive restitution payments from them, plunging Germany in particular into economic depression. The Austro-Hungarian and Ottoman empires were dismantled at the war's conclusion. The Russian Revolution resulted in the overthrow of the Tsarist regime of Nicholas II and the onset of the Russian Civil War. The victorious Bolsheviks then established the Soviet Union, the world's first communist state.

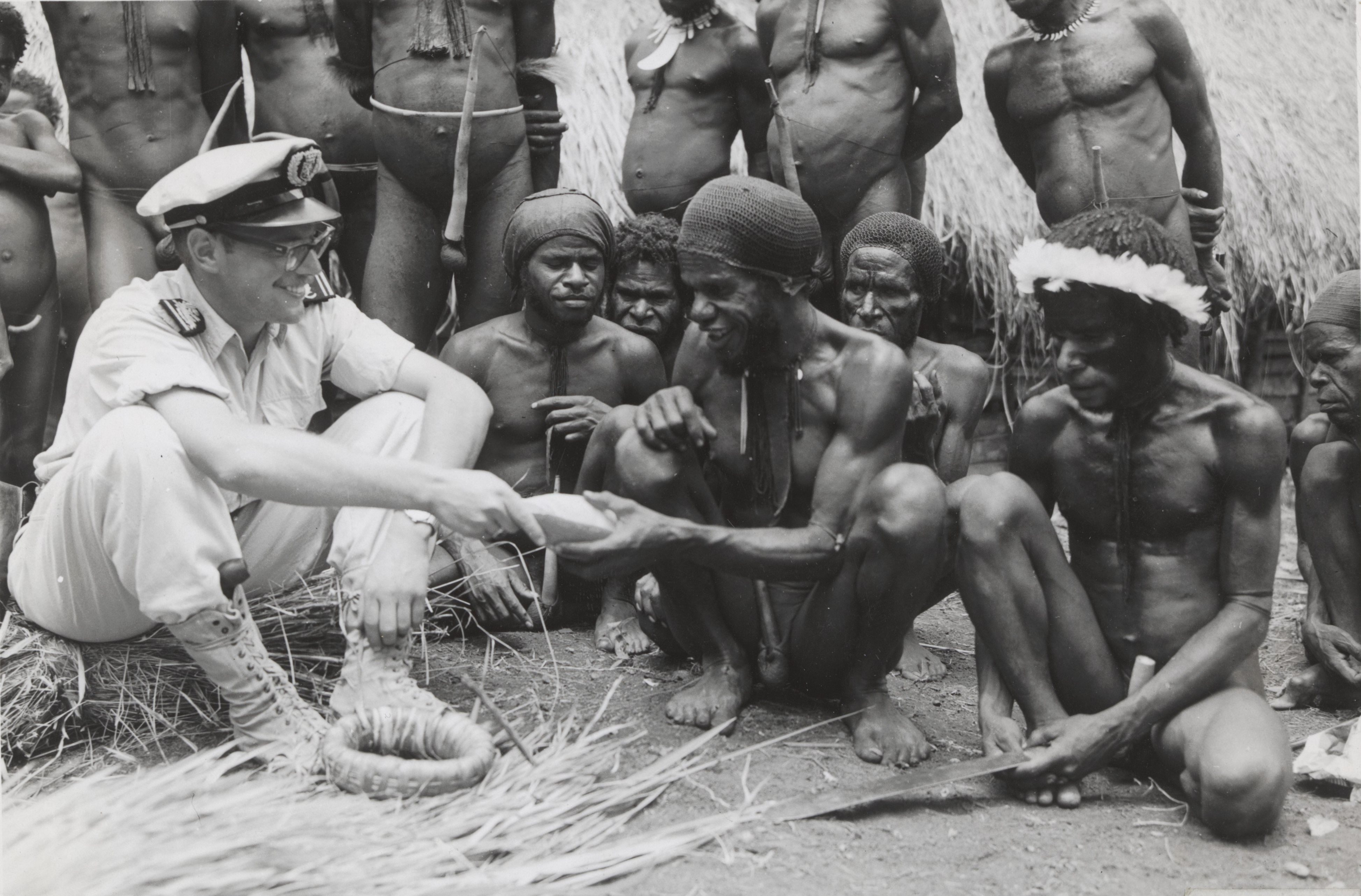
Dutch colonial officer with Papuans in the Baliem Valley, Dutch New Guinea, 1958

Fascism, a movement which grew out of post-war angst and which accelerated during the Great Depression of the 1930s, gained momentum in Italy, Germany, and Spain in the 1920s and 1930s, culminating in World War II, sparked by Nazi Germany's aggressive expansion at the expense of its neighbors. Meanwhile, Japan had rapidly transformed itself into a technologically advanced industrial power and, along with Germany and Italy, formed the Axis powers. Japan's military expansionism in East Asia and the Pacific Ocean brought it into conflict with the United States, culminating in a surprise attack which drew the US into World War II.

After some years of dramatic military success, Germany was defeated in 1945, having been invaded by the Soviet Union and Poland from the East and by the United States, the United Kingdom, Canada, and France from the West. After the victory of the Allies in Europe, the war in Asia ended with the Soviet invasion of Manchuria and the dropping of two atomic bombs on Japan by the US, the first nation to develop nuclear weapons and the only one to use them in warfare. In total, World War II left some 60 million people dead.

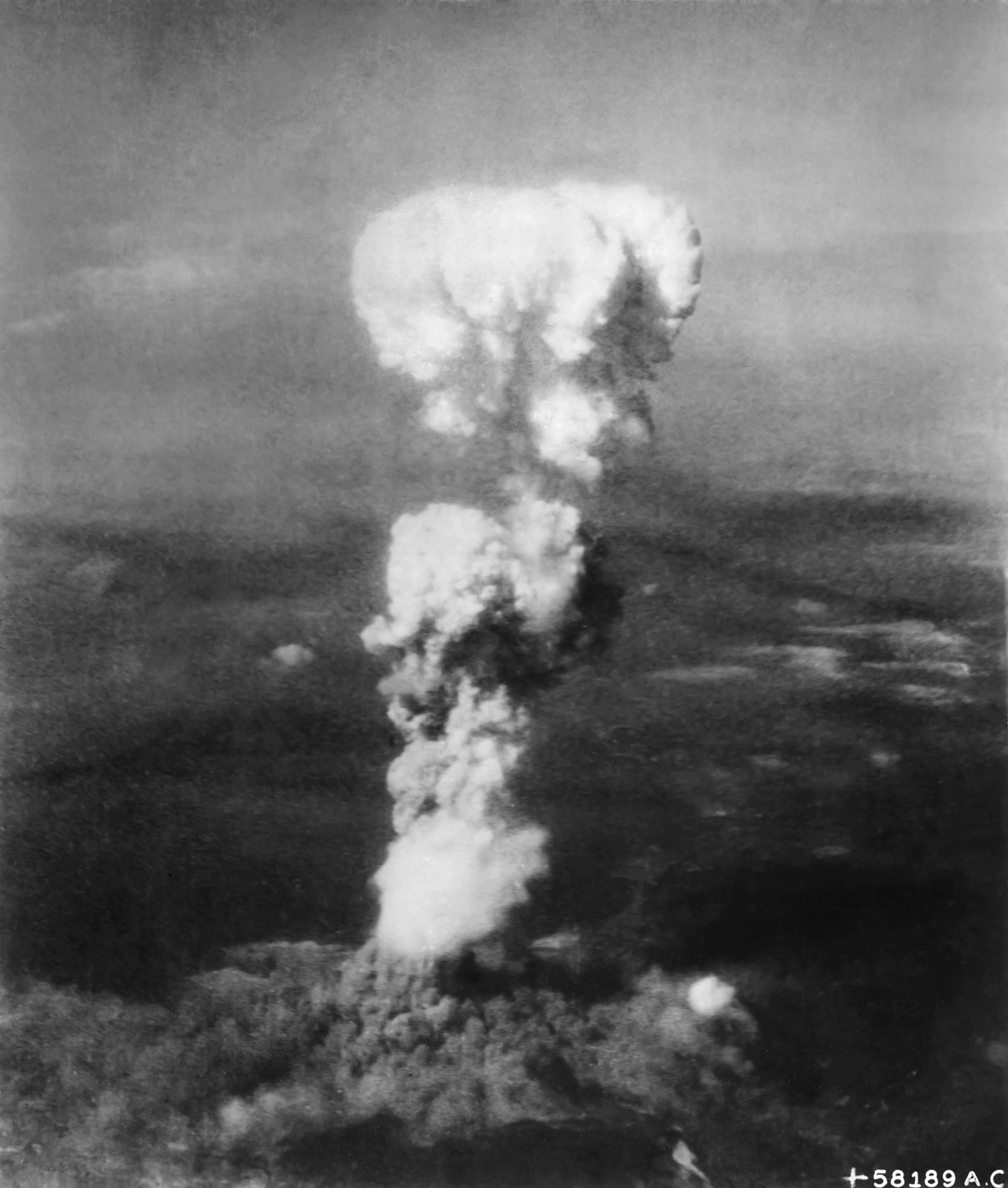
The mushroom cloud of the detonation of Little Boy, the first nuclear attack in history, on 6 August 1945 over Hiroshima, igniting the nuclear age with the international security dominating thread of mutual assured destruction in the latter half of the 20th century.

Following World War II, the United Nations (UN), successor to the League of Nations, is established as an international forum in which the world's nations could discuss issues diplomatically. It enacted resolutions on such topics as the conduct of warfare, environmental protection, international sovereignty, and human rights. Peacekeeping forces consisting of troops provided by various countries, with various United Nations and other aid agencies, helped to relieve famine, disease, and poverty, and to suppress some local armed conflicts. Europe slowly united, economically and, in some ways, politically, to form the European Union, which consisted of 15 European countries by the end of the 20th century.

After the war, Germany is occupied and divided between the Western powers and the Soviet Union. East Germany and the rest of Eastern Europe became Soviet puppet states under communist rule. Western Europe is rebuilt with the aid of the American Marshall Plan, resulting in a major post-war economic boom, and many of the affected nations became close allies of the United States.

With the Axis defeated and Britain and France rebuilding, the United States and the Soviet Union were left standing as the world's only superpowers. Allies during the war, they soon became hostile to one another as their competing ideologies of communism and democratic capitalism proliferated in Europe, which became divided by the Iron Curtain and the Berlin Wall. They formed competing military alliances (NATO and the Warsaw Pact) which engaged in a decades-long standoff known as the Cold War. The period is marked by a new arms race as the USSR became the second nation to develop nuclear weapons, which were produced by both sides in sufficient numbers to end most human life on the planet had a large-scale nuclear exchange ever occurred. Mutually assured destruction is credited by many historians as having prevented such an exchange, each side being unable to strike first at the other without ensuring an equally devastating retaliatory strike. Unable to engage one another directly, the conflict played out in a series of proxy wars around the world—particularly in China, Korea, Cuba, Vietnam, and Afghanistan—as the USSR sought to export communism while the US attempted to contain it. The technological competition between the two sides led to substantial investment in research and development which produced innovations that reached far beyond the battlefield, such as space exploration and the Internet.

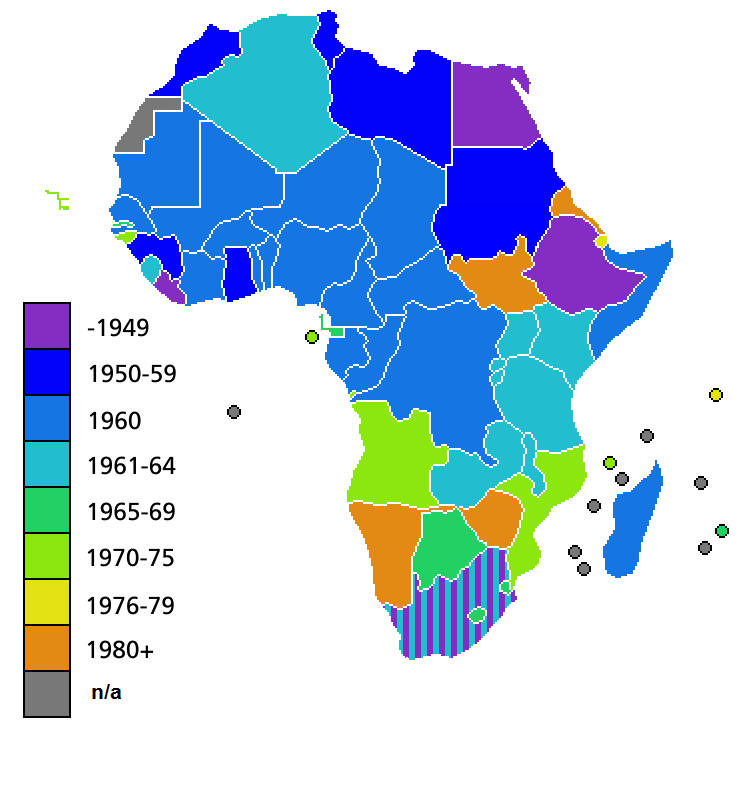
The international community grew in the second half of the century significantly due to a new wave of decolonization, particularly in Africa. Most of the newly independent states, were grouped together with many other so called developing countries. Developing countries gained attention, particularly due to rapid population growth, leading to a record world population of nearly 7 billion people by the end of the century.

In the latter half of the century, most of the European-colonized world in Africa and Asia gained independence in a process of decolonization. Meanwhile, globalization opened the door for several nations to exert a strong influence over many world affairs. The US's global military presence spread American culture around the world with the advent of the Hollywood motion picture industry and Broadway, jazz, rock music, and pop music, fast food and hippy counterculture, hip-hop, house music, and disco, as well as street style, all of which came to be identified with the concepts of popular culture and youth culture. After the Soviet Union collapsed under internal pressure in 1991, most of the communist governments it had supported around the world were dismantled—with the notable exceptions of China, North Korea, Cuba, Vietnam, and Laos—followed by difficult transitions into market economies.

== Nature of innovation and change ==
Due to continuing industrialization and expanding trade, many significant changes of the century were, directly or indirectly, economic and technological in nature. Inventions such as the light bulb, the automobile, mechanical computers, and the telephone in the late 19th century, followed by supertankers; airliners; motorways; radio communication and broadcasting; television; digital computers; air conditioning; antibiotics; nuclear power; frozen food; microcomputers; the Internet and the World Wide Web; and mobile telephones affected people's quality of life across the developed world. The quantity of goods consumed by the average person expanded massively. Scientific research, engineering professionalization and technological development—much of it motivated by the Cold War arms race—drove changes in everyday life.

== Social change ==
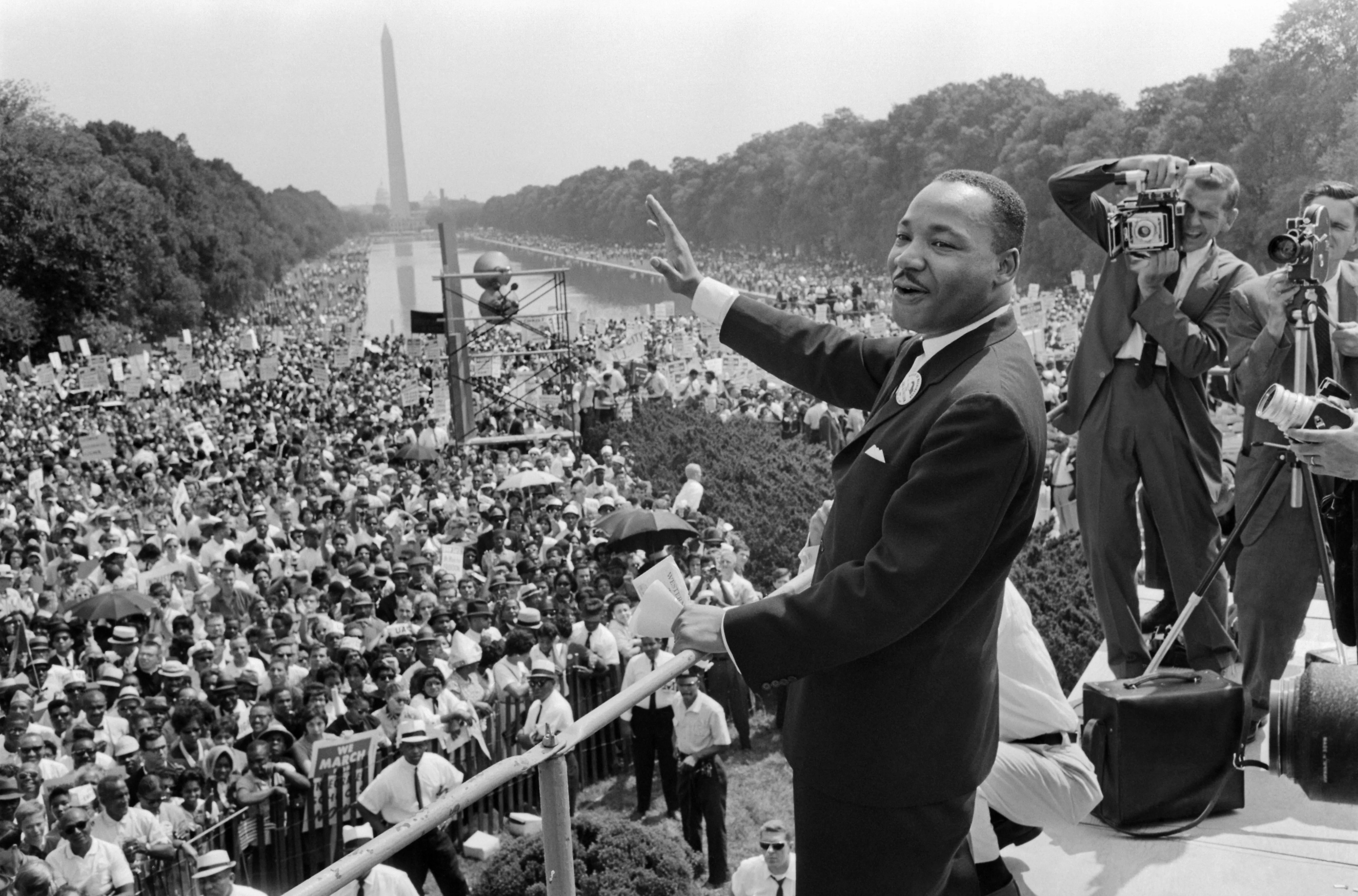
Martin Luther King Jr., an African American civil rights movement leader (Washington, August 1963)

Starting from the century, strong discrimination based on race and sex is significant in most societies. Although the Atlantic slave trade had ended in the 19th century, movements for equality for non-white people in the white-dominated societies of North America, Europe, and South Africa continued. By the end of the 20th century, in many parts of the world, women had the same legal rights as men, and racism had come to be seen as unacceptable, a sentiment often backed up by legislation. When the Republic of India is constituted, the disadvantaged classes of the caste system in India became entitled to affirmative action benefits in education, employment and government.

Attitudes toward pre-marital sex changed rapidly in many societies during the sexual revolution of the 1960s and 1970s. Attitudes towards homosexuality also began to change in the later part of the century.

Trauma brought on by events like World War I and World War II, with their military death tolls alone at bare minimum being 29,697,963, and the Spanish Flu, whose death count alone exceeded that, helped make society in many countries more egalitarian and less neglectful of the poor.

== Earth at the end of the 20th century ==
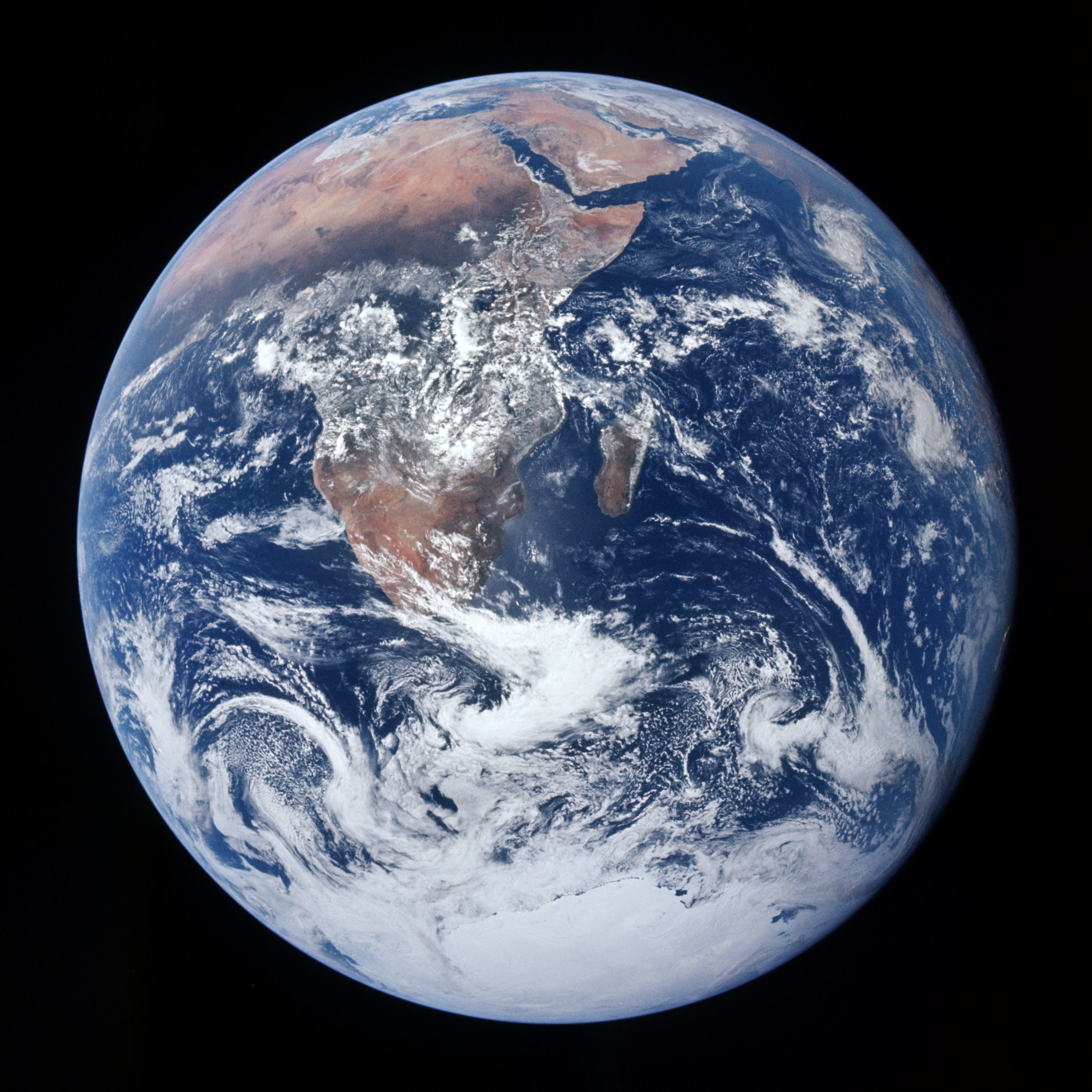
The Blue Marble, Earth as seen from Apollo 17 in December 1972. The photograph is taken by LMP Harrison Schmitt. The second half of the 20th century saw humanity's first space exploration.

Economic growth and technological progress had radically altered daily lives. Europe appeared to be at a sustainable peace for the first time in recorded history. The people of the Indian subcontinent, a sixth of the world population at the end of the 20th century, had attained an indigenous independence for the first time in centuries. China, an ancient nation comprising a fifth of the world population, is finally open to the world, creating a new state after the near-complete destruction of the old cultural order. With the end of colonialism and the Cold War, nearly a billion people in Africa were left in new nation states.

The world is undergoing its second major period of globalization; the first, which started in the 18th century, having been terminated by World War I. Since the US is in a dominant position, a major part of the process is Americanization. The influence of China and India is also rising, as the world's largest populations were rapidly integrating with the world economy.

Terrorism, dictatorship, and the spread of nuclear weapons were pressing global issues. The world is still blighted by small-scale wars and other violent conflicts, fueled by competition over resources and by ethnic conflicts.

Disease threatened to destabilize many regions of the world. New viruses such as the West Nile virus continued to spread. Malaria and other diseases affected large populations. Millions were infected with HIV, the virus which causes AIDS. The virus is becoming an epidemic in southern Africa.

Based on research done by climate scientists, the majority of the scientific community consider that in the long term environmental problems pose a serious threat. One argument is that of global warming occurring due to human-caused emission of greenhouse gases, particularly carbon dioxide produced by the burning of fossil fuels. This prompted many nations to negotiate and sign the Kyoto treaty, which set mandatory limits on carbon dioxide emissions.

World population increased from about 1.6 billion people in 1901 to 6.1 billion at the century's end.

== Wars and politics ==
Map of territorial changes in Europe after World War I (as of 1923).

The number of people killed during the century by government actions is in the hundreds of millions. This includes deaths caused by wars, genocide, politicide and mass murders. The deaths from acts of war during the two world wars alone have been estimated at between 50 and 80 million. Political scientist Rudolph Rummel estimated 262,000,000 deaths caused by democide, which excludes those killed in war battles, civilians unintentionally killed in war and killings of rioting mobs. According to Charles Tilly, "Altogether, about 100 million people died as a direct result of action by organized military units backed by one government or another over the course of the century. Most likely a comparable number of civilians died of war-induced disease and other indirect effects." It is estimated that approximately 70 million Europeans died through war, violence and famine between 1914 and 1945.

- Russo-Japanese War, between the Russian Empire and the Empire of Japan during 1904 and 1905 over rival imperial ambitions in Manchuria and the Korean Empire.
- Russian Revolution of 1905, a wave of mass political and social unrest then began to spread across the vast areas of the Russian Empire. The unrest is directed primarily against the Tsar, the nobility, and the ruling class. It included worker strikes, peasant unrest, and military mutinies.
- Sinking of the Titanic, RMS Titanic sank on 15 April 1912 in the North Atlantic Ocean. The largest ocean liner in service at the time, Titanic is four days into her maiden voyage from Southampton, England, to New York City, with an estimated 2,224 people on board when she struck an iceberg at 23:40 (ship's time)[a] on 14 April.
- The Armenian, Assyrian and Greek genocides were the systematic destruction, mass murder and expulsion of the Armenians, Assyrians and Greeks in the Ottoman Empire during World War I, spearheaded by the ruling Committee of Union and Progress (CUP).
- The Alliance of Eight Nations (Austro-Hungarian Empire, French Republic, German Empire, Kingdom of Italy, Empire of Japan, Russian Empire, United Kingdom of Great Britain and Ireland and United States of America) formed in 1900 to invade the Qing China represented the club of great powers in the early 20th century.
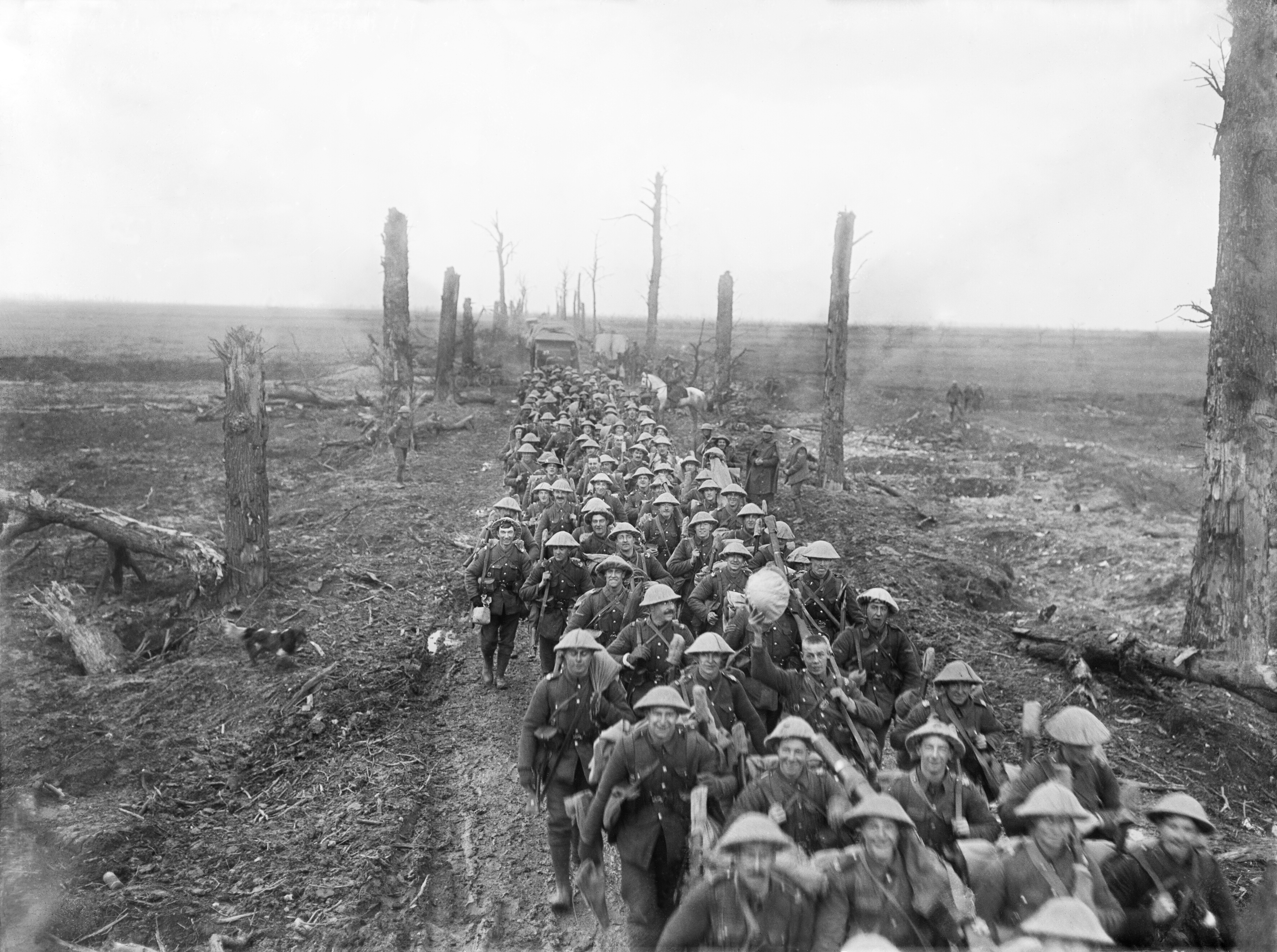
  British Army advancing on the Western Front in March 1917
- Rising nationalism and increasing national awareness were among the many causes of World War I (1914–1918), the first of two wars to involve many major world powers including Germany, France, Italy, Japan, Russia/USSR, the British Empire and the United States. At the time, it is said by many to be the "war to end all wars".
- The Arab Revolt of 1916 is an armed uprising against the Ottoman Empire done by the Arabs in agreement with the British and French empires. The revolt is led by Sharif Hussein bin Ali who is promised by Henry McMahon, the British High Commissioner in Egypt and the French government, that in exchange for fighting the Ottoman Empire, Sharif Hussein would gain control over all Arab lands under the Ottoman Empire. A promise the British and French did not honor.
- During World War I, in the Russian Revolution of 1917, 300 years of Tsarist reign were ended and the Bolsheviks, under the leadership of Vladimir Lenin, established the world's first Communist state.
- The end of World War I saw the collapse of the central powers, the German Empire, the Austrian-Hungarian Empire, the Kingdom of Bulgaria, and the Ottoman Empire into several independent sovereign states throughout Central Europe, the Balkans, and the Middle East.
- After gaining political rights in the United States and much of Europe in the first part of the century, and with the advent of new birth control techniques, women became more independent throughout the century.
- Industrial warfare greatly increased in its scale and complexity during the first half of the 20th century. Notable developments included chemical warfare, the introduction of military aviation and the widespread use of submarines. The introduction of nuclear warfare in the mid-20th century marked the definite transition to modern warfare.
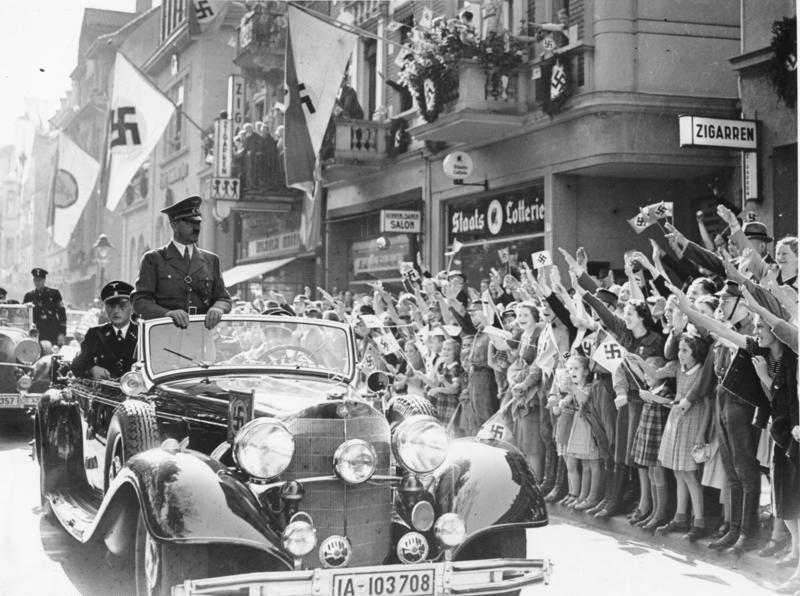
  German dictator Adolf Hitler in Bad Godesberg, Nazi Germany, 1938
- The Revolutions of 1917–1923 occurred during and World War I inspired by the Russian Revolution which saw many political changes in Europe and in Asia.
- The Osage Murders of 1918–1931 were a series of killings of members of the Native American Osage Nation, who were the richest people per capita in the world at that time.
- The 1921 Tulsa Race Massacre, is a racist anti black terrorist attack in the Greenwood District in Tulsa, Oklahoma, which is home to many successful and wealthy Black Americans. The attack is perpetrated by white residents and local white deputies. The perpetrators were armed by local government officials.
- The 1923 Beer Hall Putsch failed coup d'état by Nazi Party leader Adolf Hitler.
- The Great Depression in the 1930s led to the rise of Fascism (especially Nazism) in Europe.
- Holodomor, man-made famine in Soviet Ukraine from 1932 to 1933 that killed millions of Ukrainians.
- Night of the Long Knives, purge that took place in Nazi Germany from 30 June to 2 July 1934.
- The 1934 to 1935 Long March, military retreat by the Chinese Red Army and Chinese Communist Party (CCP) from advancing Kuomintang forces.
- A violent civil war broke out in Spain in 1936 when General Francisco Franco rebelled against the Second Spanish Republic. Many consider this war as a testing battleground for World War II, as the fascist armies bombed some Spanish territories.
- Great Purge, political purge in the Soviet Union that took place from 1936 and 1938.
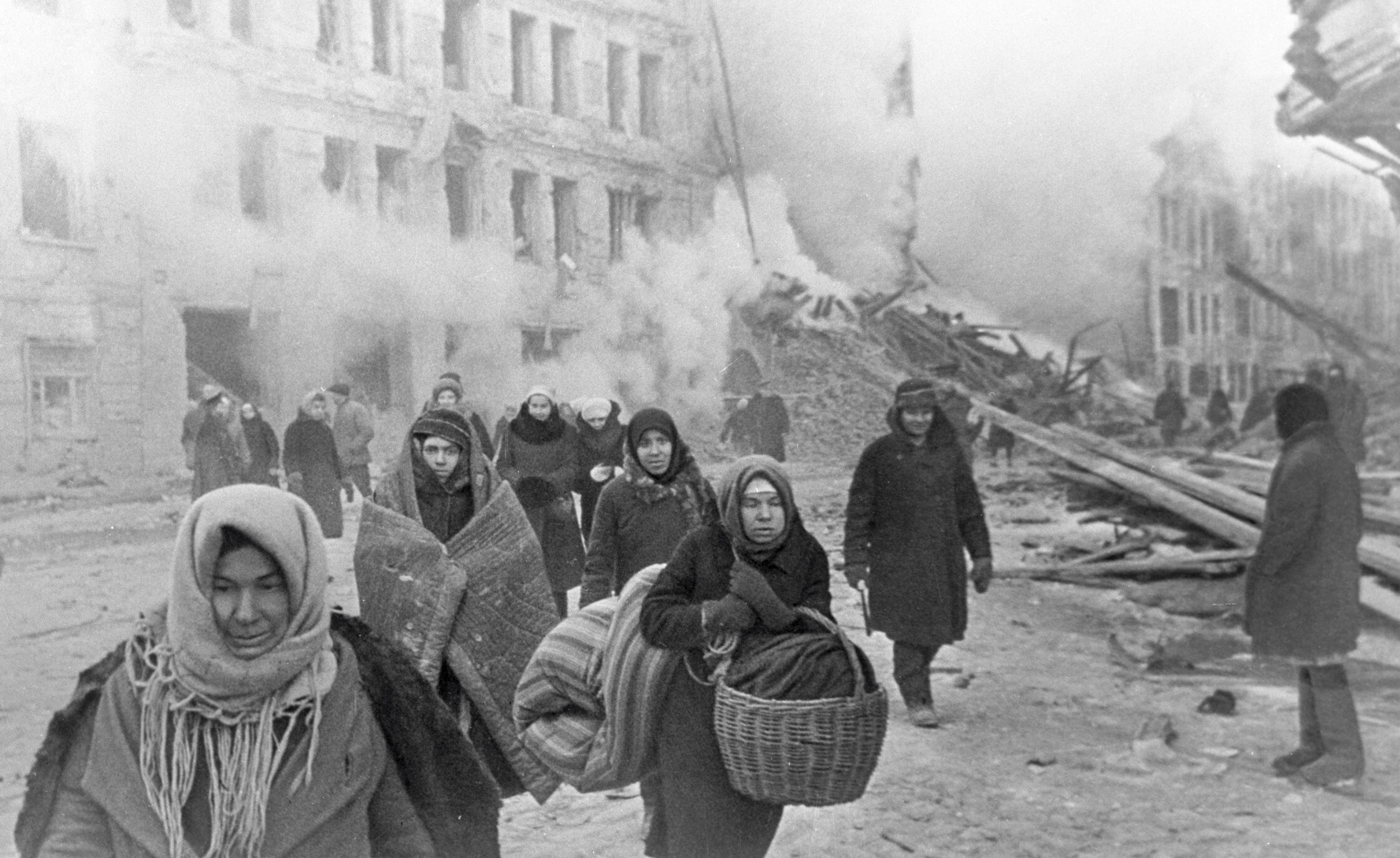
  The Siege of Leningrad during World War II is widely considered one of the most lethal sieges in history
- The 1938 Kristallnacht, pogrom against Jews carried out by the Nazi Party's Sturmabteilung (SA) and Schutzstaffel (SS) paramilitary forces
- World War II (1939–1945) became the deadliest conflict in human history involving primarily the axis, Nazi Germany, Fascist Italy, and the Empire of Japan against the allies, China, France, the United Kingdom, the Soviet Union, and the United States. The Soviet Union suffered immense casualties in World War II, with the widely accepted figure being around 27 million deaths, representing the highest national toll of the war. Many atrocities occurred, particularly the Holocaust killing approximately 11 million victims. It ended with the atomic bombings on Hiroshima and Nagasaki in Japan.
- The two world wars led to efforts to increase international cooperation, notably through the founding of the League of Nations after World War I, and its successor, the United Nations, after World War II.
- The creation of Israel in 1948, a Jewish state in the Middle East, at the end of the British Mandate for Palestine, fueled many conflicts between Israelis and Palestinians in addition to regional conflicts. These were also influenced by the vast oil fields in many of the other countries of the predominantly Arab region.
- In 1948 The Nakba is, according to several historians, a targeted ethnic cleansing campaign against Arabs in Palestine perpetrated by Jewish Militias under Plan Delta, a plan ordered by Ben-Gurion. The campaign utilized methods of intimidation, violent attacks, and the destruction of several Arab villages.
- After the Soviet Union's involvement in World War II, communism became a major force in global politics, notably in Eastern Europe, China, Indochina and Cuba, where communist parties gained near-absolute power.

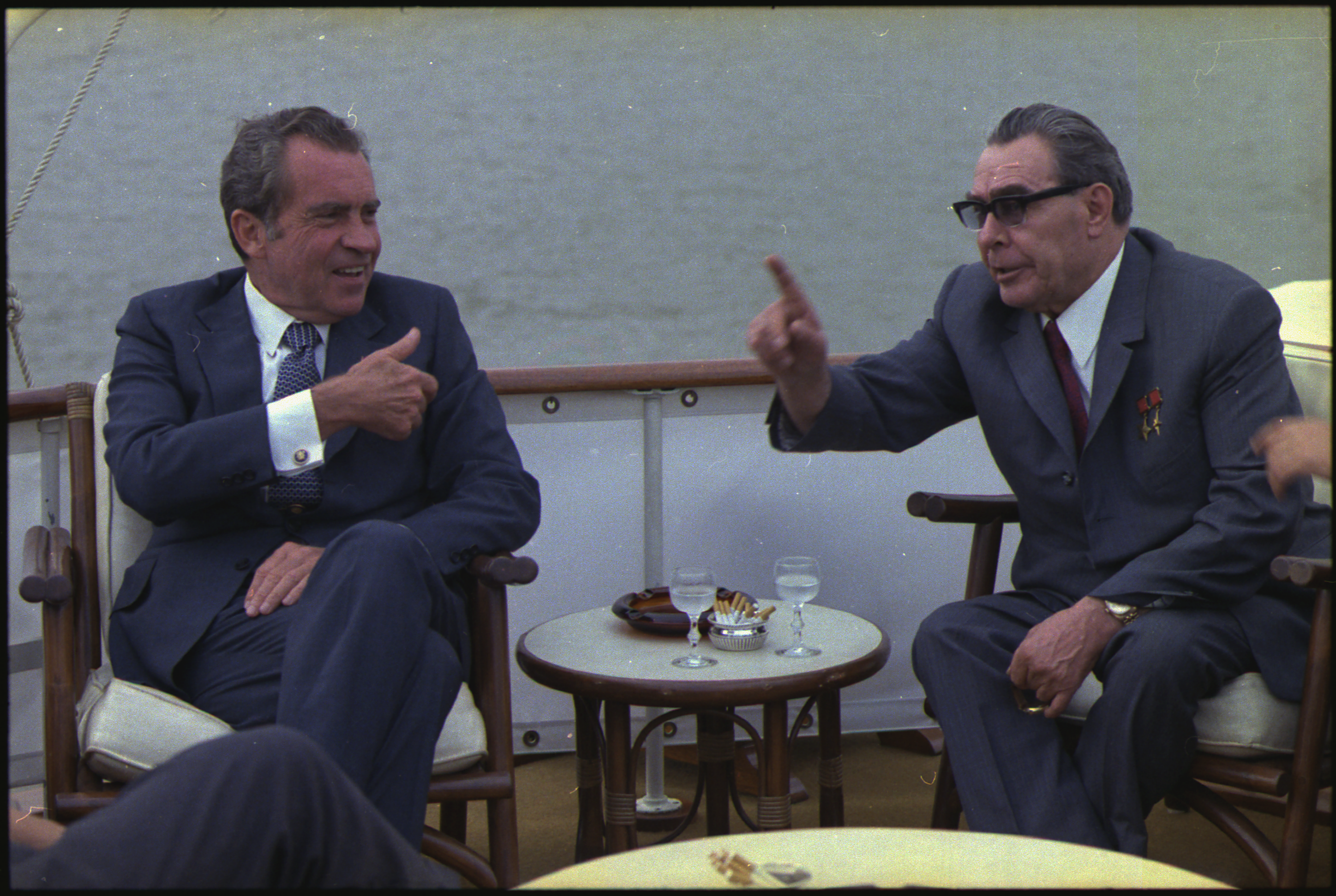
Richard Nixon and Leonid Brezhnev aboard USS Sequoia, 19 June 1973

- The Cold War (1947–1991) involved an arms race and increasing competition between the two major players in the world: the Soviet Union and the United States. This competition included the development and improvement of nuclear weapons and space technology. This led to the proxy wars with the Western bloc, including wars in Korea (1950–1953) and in Vietnam (1957–1975).
- The Soviet authorities caused the deaths of millions of their own citizens to eliminate domestic opposition. More than 18 million people passed through the Gulag, with a further 6 million being exiled to remote areas of the Soviet Union.
- Nationalist movements in the Indian subcontinent led to the independence and partition of Jawaharlal Nehru-led India and Muhammad Ali Jinnah-led Pakistan, although would lead to conflicts between the two nations such as border and territorial disputes.
- After a long period of civil wars and conflicts with western powers, China's last imperial dynasty ended in 1912. The resulting republic is replaced, after another civil war, by the communist People's Republic of China in 1949. At the end of the 20th century, though still ruled by a communist party, China's economic system had started the reform and opening up, transitioning to a market-based economy.
- Mahatma Gandhi's nonviolence and Indian independence movement against the British Empire influenced many political movements around the world, including the civil rights movement in the United States, and freedom movements in South Africa against apartheid challenging racial segregation
- The end of colonialism led to the independence of many African and Asian countries, from the two largest colonial empires in the world, the British and French colonial empires. During the Cold War, many of these aligned with the United States, the USSR, or China for defense.
- 1956 Poznań protests, the first of several massive protests against the communist government of the Polish People's Republic.

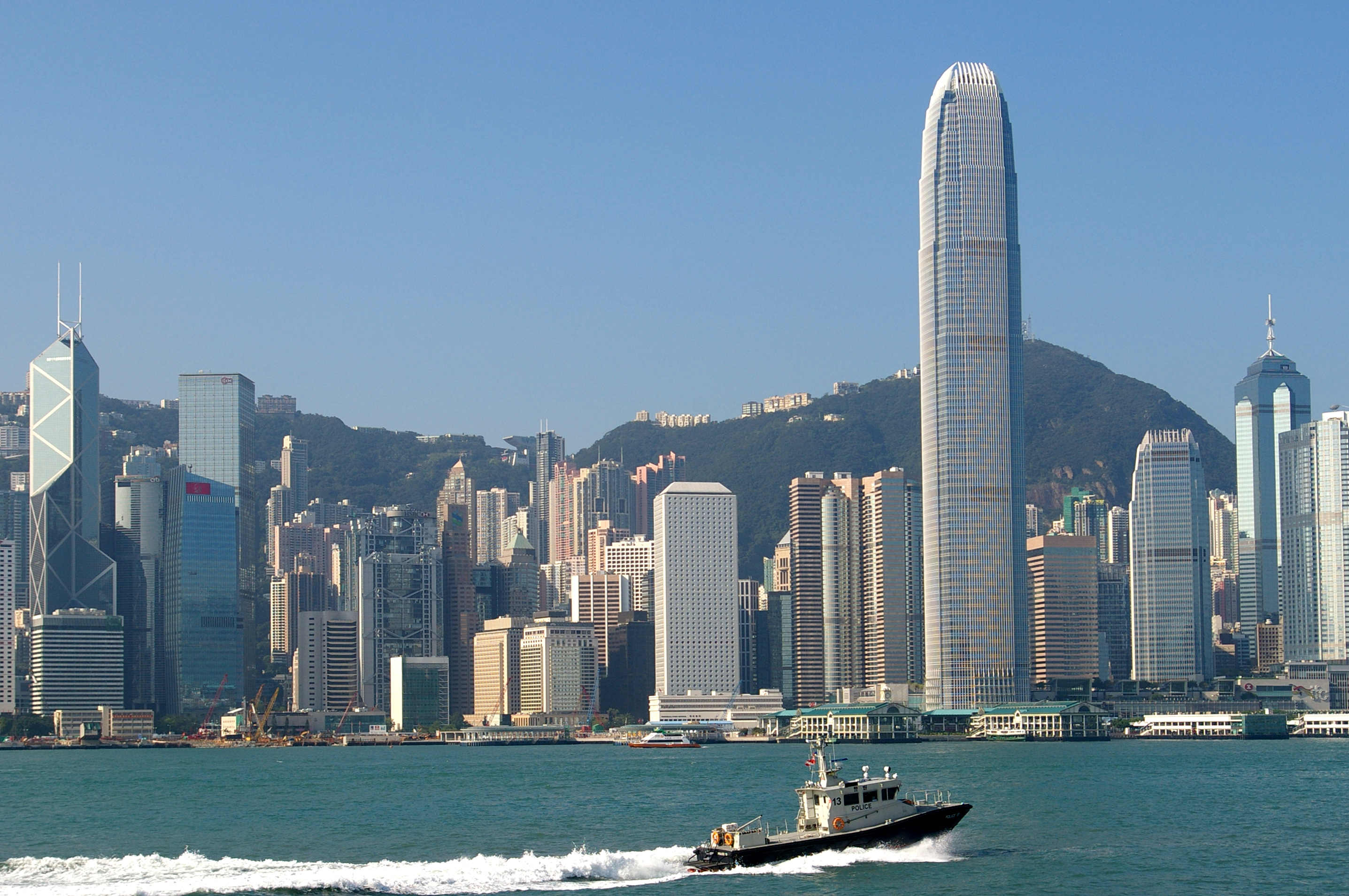
Hong Kong, under British administration from 1842 to 1997, is one of the original Four Asian Tigers.

- Hungarian Revolution of 1956, attempted countrywide revolution against the government of the Hungarian People's Republic (1949–1989) and the policies caused by the government's subordination to the Soviet Union (USSR).
- Mao Zedong's radical policy of modernization leads to the Great Chinese Famine causing the death of tens of millions of Chinese peasants between 1959 and 1962. It is thought to be the largest famine in human history.
- Cuban Missile Crisis, 13-day confrontation between the governments of the United States and the Soviet Union, when American deployments of nuclear missiles in Italy and Turkey were matched by Soviet deployments of nuclear missiles in Cuba.
- The Vietnam War caused two million deaths, changed the dynamics between the Eastern and Western Blocs, and altered global North-South relations.
- The 1967 Six-Day War, fought between Israel and a coalition of Arab states, primarily Egypt, Syria, and Jordan.
- The 1968 Prague Spring, period of political liberalization and mass protest in the Czechoslovak Socialist Republic.
- 1970 Polish protests, protests were sparked by a sudden increase in the prices of food and other everyday items while wages remained stagnant.
- Yom Kippur War, fought from 6 to 25 October 1973 between Israel and a coalition of Arab states led by Egypt and Syria.
- Iranian revolution, series of events that culminated in the overthrow of the Pahlavi dynasty in 1979.
- The Soviet invasion of Afghanistan caused an estimated two million deaths and contributed to the dissolution of the Soviet Union along with complete political turmoil in Afghanistan
- The 1981 Martial law in Poland, the government of the Polish People's Republic drastically restricted everyday life by introducing martial law and a military junta in an attempt to counter political opposition, in particular the Solidarity movement.
- The 1986 Chernobyl disaster, the worst nuclear disaster in history.
- The revolutions of 1989 released Eastern and Central Europe from Soviet control. Soon thereafter, the Soviet Union, Czechoslovakia, and Yugoslavia dissolved; the former having many states seceded and the latter violently over several years, into successor states, with many rife with ethnic nationalism. Meanwhile, East Germany and West Germany were reunified in 1990.
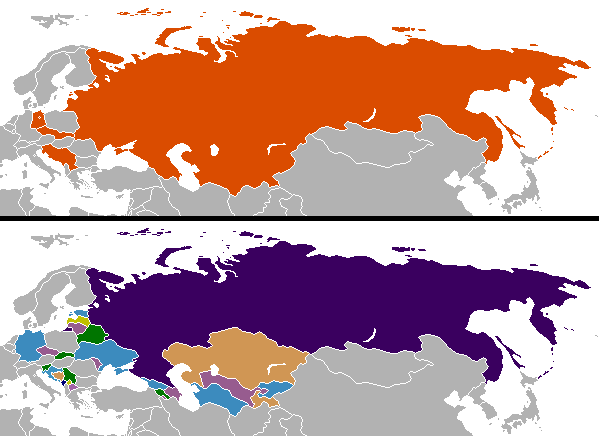
  Changes in national boundaries after the end of the Cold War and the dissolution of the Soviet Union in 1991
- The Tiananmen Square protests of 1989, culminating in the deaths of hundreds of civilian protesters and thousands of wounded, were a series of demonstrations in and near Tiananmen Square in Beijing, China. Led mainly by students and intellectuals, the protests occurred in a year that saw the collapse of a number of communist governments around the world.
- 1991 Soviet coup attempt, a failed attempt by hardliners of the Communist Party of the Soviet Union (CPSU) to forcibly seize control of the country from Mikhail Gorbachev, who is Soviet President and General Secretary of the CPSU at the time.
- Bosnian War, international armed conflict that took place in Bosnia and Herzegovina between 1992 and 1995.
- The 1994 Rwandan genocide, over a span of around 100 days, members of the Tutsi ethnic group, as well as some moderate Hutu and Twa, were systematically killed by Hutu militias.
- European integration began in earnest in the 1950s in France and Germany, and eventually led to the European Union, a political and economic union that comprised 15 countries at the end of the 20th century.

== Culture and entertainment ==
I and the Village, 1911, by Marc Chagall, a modern painter

- As the century began, Paris is the artistic capital of the world, where both French and foreign writers, composers and visual artists gathered. By the middle of the century New York City had become the artistic capital of the world.
- Theater, films, music and the media had a major influence on fashion and trends in all aspects of life. As many films and much music originate from the United States, American culture spread rapidly over the world.
- 1953 saw the coronation of Queen Elizabeth II, an iconic figure of the century.
- Visual culture became more dominant not only in films but in comics and television as well. During the century a new skilled understanding of narrativist imagery is developed.
- Computer games and internet surfing became new and popular form of entertainment during the last 25 years of the century.
- In literature, science fiction, fantasy (with well-developed fictional worlds, rich in detail), and alternative history fiction gained popularity. Detective fiction gained popularity in the interwar period. In the United States in 1961 Grove Press published Tropic of Cancer a novel by Henry Miller redefining pornography and censorship in publishing in America.

=== Music ===
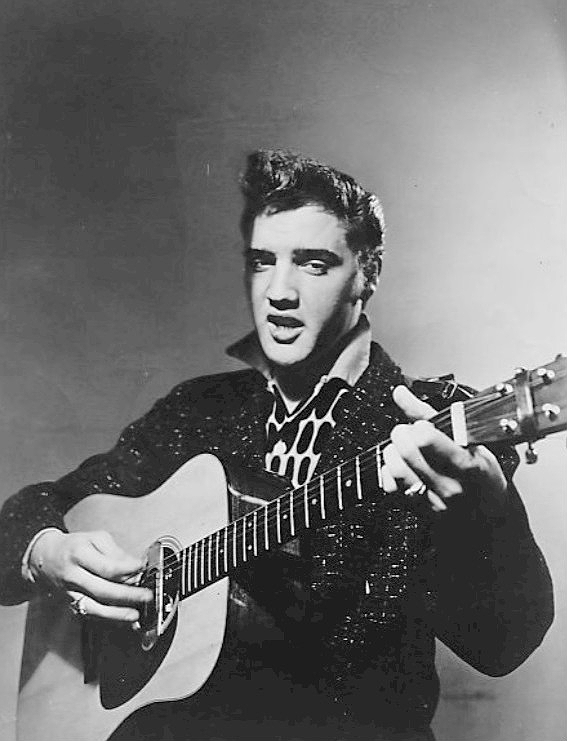
Elvis Presley in 1956, a leading figure of rock and roll and rockabilly.

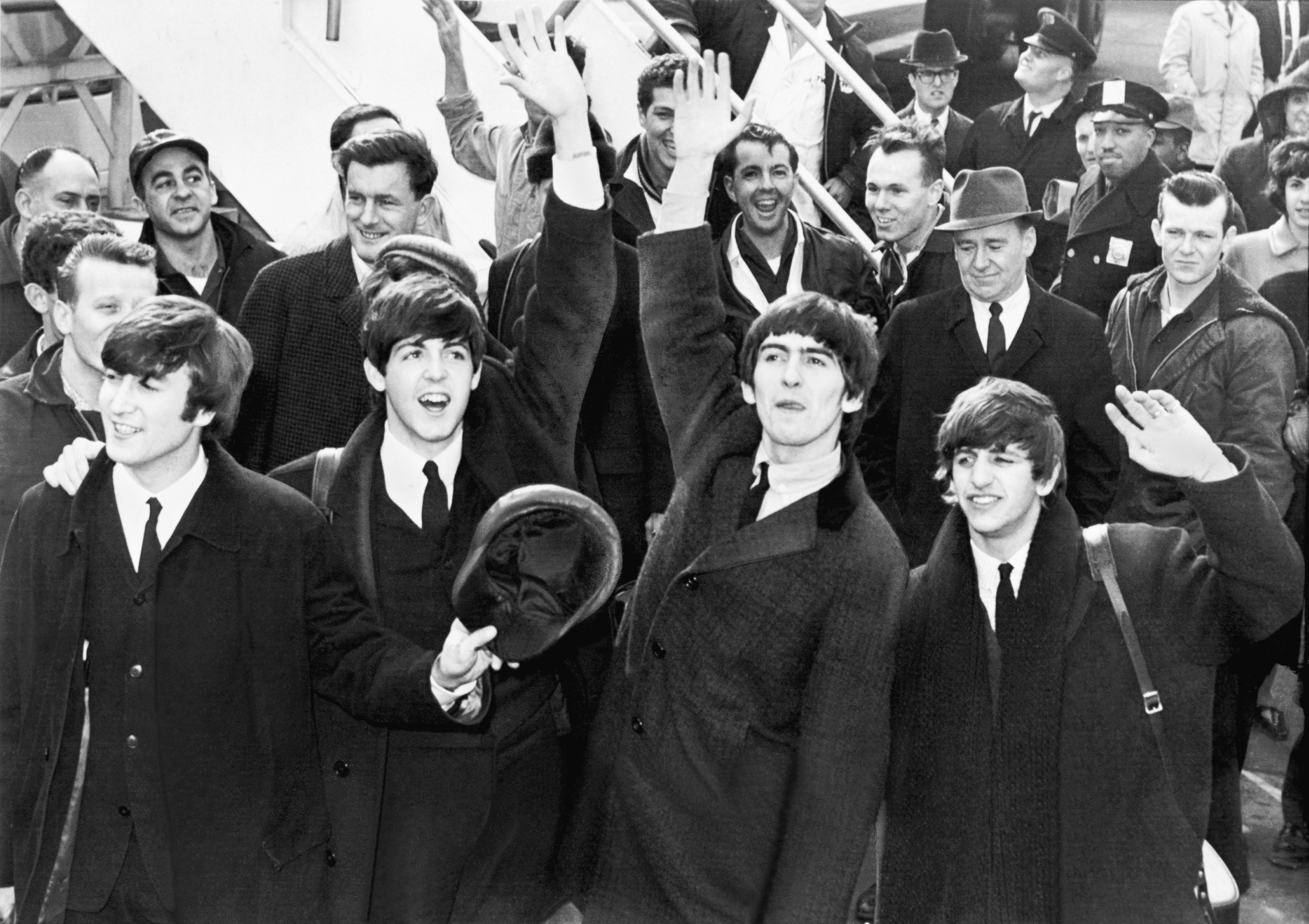
The Beatles in 1964, widely regarded as one of the most influential bands in Western popular music.

The invention of music recording technologies such as the phonograph record, and dissemination technologies such as radio broadcasting, massively expanded the audience for music. Prior to the 20th century, music is generally only experienced in live performances. Many new genres of music were established during the 20th century.

- Igor Stravinsky revolutionized classical composition.
- In the 1920s, Arnold Schoenberg developed the twelve-tone technique, which became widely influential on 20th-century composers.
- In classical music, composition branched out into many completely new domains, including dodecaphony, aleatoric (chance) music, and minimalism.
- Tango is created in Argentina and became extremely popular in the rest of the Americas and Europe.
- Blues and jazz music became popularized during the 1910s, 1920s and 1930s in the United States. Bebop develops as a form of jazz in the 1940s.
- Country music develops in the 1920s and 1930s in the United States.
- Blues and country went on to influence rock and roll in the 1950s, which along with folk music, increased in popularity with the counterculture of the mid-to-late 1960s.
- Rock soon branched into many different genres, including folk rock, heavy metal, punk rock, and alternative rock and became the dominant genre of popular music.
- This is challenged with the rise of hip-hop in the 1980s and 1990s.
- Other genres such as house, techno, reggae, and soul all developed during the latter half of the century and went through various periods of popularity.
- Synthesizers began to be employed widely in music and crossed over into the mainstream with new wave music in the 1980s. Electronic instruments have been widely deployed in all manners of popular music and has led to the development of such genres as house, synth-pop, electronic dance music, and industrial.

=== Film, television and theatre ===
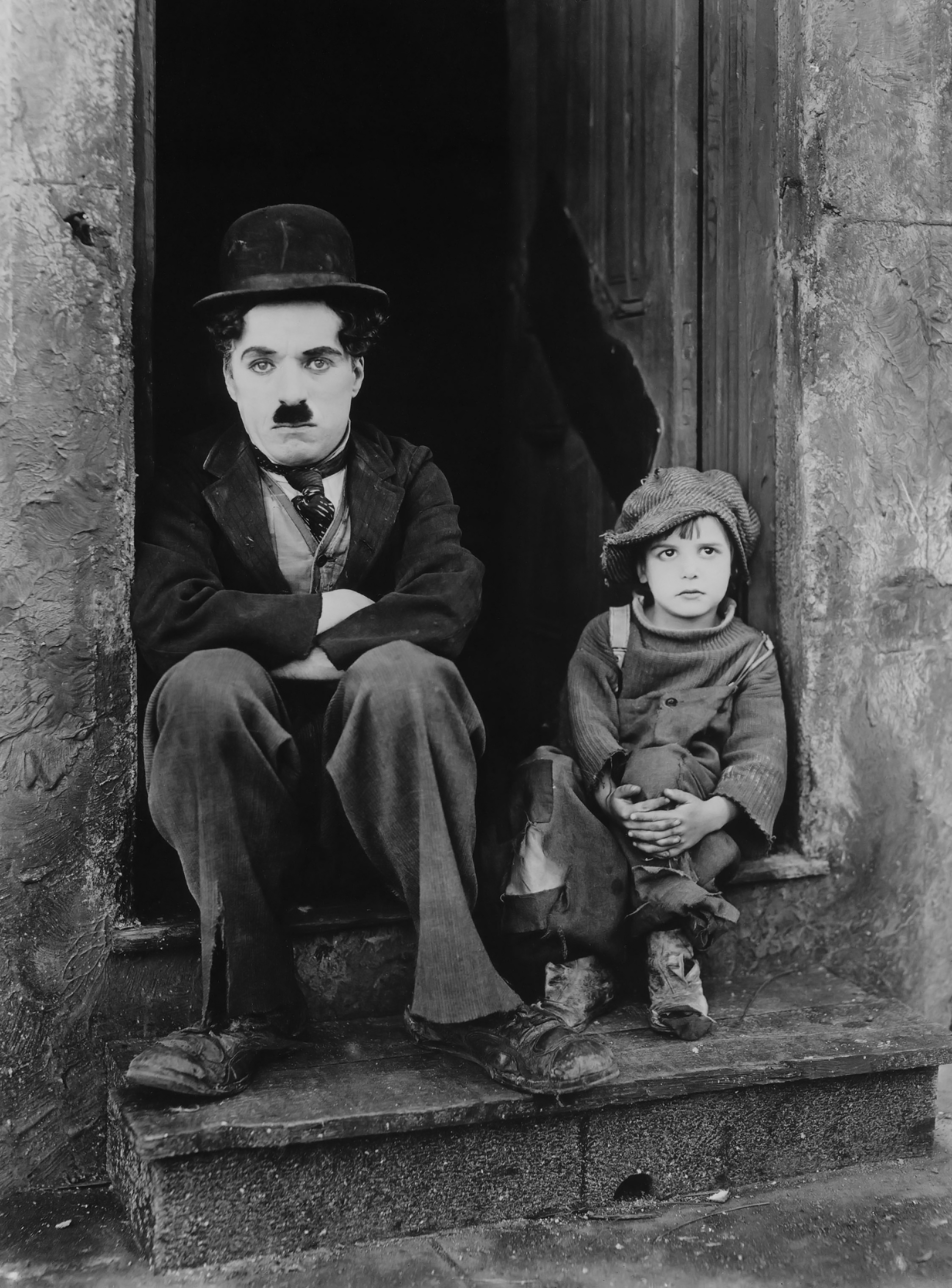
Charlie Chaplin in his 1921 film The Kid, with Jackie Coogan.

Film as an artistic medium is created in the 20th century. The first modern movie theatre is established in Pittsburgh in 1905. Hollywood developed as the center of American film production. The greatest characters including The Tramp (Charlie Chaplin) debut in 1914 and Laurel and Hardy debut in 1921, Warner Bros.' the first full-length feature sound film The Jazz Singer, released in 1927, Disney and Fleischer's greatest animated cartoon characters including Mickey Mouse and Betty Boop, in were created 1928 and 1930, respectively, Universal's feature films Frankenstein and Dracula, released in both 1931, RKO's feature film King Kong, released in 1933, Disney's the first full-length animated feature film Snow White and the Seven Dwarfs, released in 1937, Metro-Goldwyn-Mayer's feature film The Wizard of Oz, released in 1939, Disney's animated feature films Pinocchio and Fantasia, released in both 1940 and Cinderella, released in 1950, Metro-Goldwyn-Mayer's feature film Singin' in the Rain, released in 1952, Disney's animated feature film Sleeping Beauty, released in 1959, Metro-Goldwyn-Mayer's feature film Ben-Hur, released in 1959, Disney's live-action/animated musical feature film Mary Poppins, released in 1964, 20th Century Fox and Lucasfilm science fiction space opera feature films Star Wars (original trilogy: A New Hope, released in 1977, The Empire Strikes Back, released in 1980 and Return of the Jedi, released in 1983), Touchstone Pictures' live-action/animated feature film Who Framed Roger Rabbit, released in 1988, the renaissance of Disney's animated feature films The Little Mermaid, released in 1989, Beauty and the Beast, released in 1991, Aladdin, released in 1992 and The Lion King, released in 1994, Disney and Pixar's the first full-length computer-animated feature film Toy Story, released in 1995, 20th Century Fox's animated feature film Anastasia, released in 1997, 20th Century Fox's feature film Titanic, released in 1997 and Disney and Pixar's computer-animated feature film A Bug's Life, released in 1998.

- Julie Andrews, Harry Belafonte, Humphrey Bogart, Marlon Brando, Richard Burton, James Cagney, Michael Caine, Charlie Chaplin, Sean Connery, Gary Cooper, Tom Cruise, James Dean, Robert De Niro, Kirk Douglas, Errol Flynn, Harrison Ford, Clark Gable, Judy Garland, Cary Grant, Audrey Hepburn, Katharine Hepburn, Grace Kelly, Burt Lancaster, Bruce Lee, Vivien Leigh, Steve McQueen, Marilyn Monroe, Paul Newman, Jack Nicholson, Laurence Olivier, Al Pacino, Sidney Poitier, Meryl Streep, Elizabeth Taylor, James Stewart, Henry Fonda, Jane Fonda and John Wayne are among the most popular Hollywood stars of the 20th century.
- Madhubala, Jean-Paul Belmondo, Karel Roden, Sean Connery, Marcello Mastroianni, Salah Zulfikar, Marlene Dietrich, Brigitte Bardot, Omar Sharif, Catherine Deneuve, Alain Delon, Soad Hosny, Fernanda Montenegro, Sophie Marceau, Fatima Rushdi, Amitabh Bachchan, Jean Gabin, Toshiro Mifune, Shoukry Sarhan, Lars Mikkelsen, Sophia Loren, Youssef Wahbi, Claudia Cardinale, Klaus Kinski, Gérard Depardieu, Max von Sydow, Faten Hamama, Rutger Hauer and Toni Servillo are among the most popular movie stars of the 20th century.
- Sergei Eisenstein, D. W. Griffith, Cecil B. DeMille, Frank Capra, Howard Hawks, John Ford, Orson Welles, Martin Scorsese, John Huston, Alfred Hitchcock, Akira Kurosawa, Spike Lee, Ingmar Bergman, Federico Fellini, Walt Disney, Stanley Kubrick, Steven Spielberg, Sergey Parajanov, Ridley Scott, Woody Allen, Quentin Tarantino, James Cameron, William Friedkin, Ezz El-Dine Zulficar and George Lucas are among the most important and popular filmmakers of the 20th century.
- In theater, sometimes referred to as Broadway in New York City, playwrights such as Eugene O'Neill, Samuel Beckett, Edward Albee, Arthur Miller and Tennessee Williams introduced innovative language and ideas to the idiom. In musical theater, figures such as Rodgers and Hammerstein, Lerner and Loewe, Mohammed Karim, and Irving Berlin had an enormous impact on both film and the culture in general.
- Modern dance is born in America as a 'rebellion' against centuries-old European ballet. Dancers and choreographers Alvin Ailey, Isadora Duncan, Vaslav Nijinsky, Ruth St. Denis, Mahmoud Reda, Martha Graham, José Limón, Doris Humphrey, Merce Cunningham, and Paul Taylor re-defined movement, struggling to bring it back to its 'natural' roots and along with Jazz, created a solely American art form. Alvin Ailey is credited with popularizing modern dance and revolutionizing African-American participation in 20th-century concert dance. His company gained the nickname "Cultural Ambassador to the World" because of its extensive international touring. Ailey's choreographic masterpiece Revelations is believed to be the best known and most often seen modern dance performance.

=== Video games ===
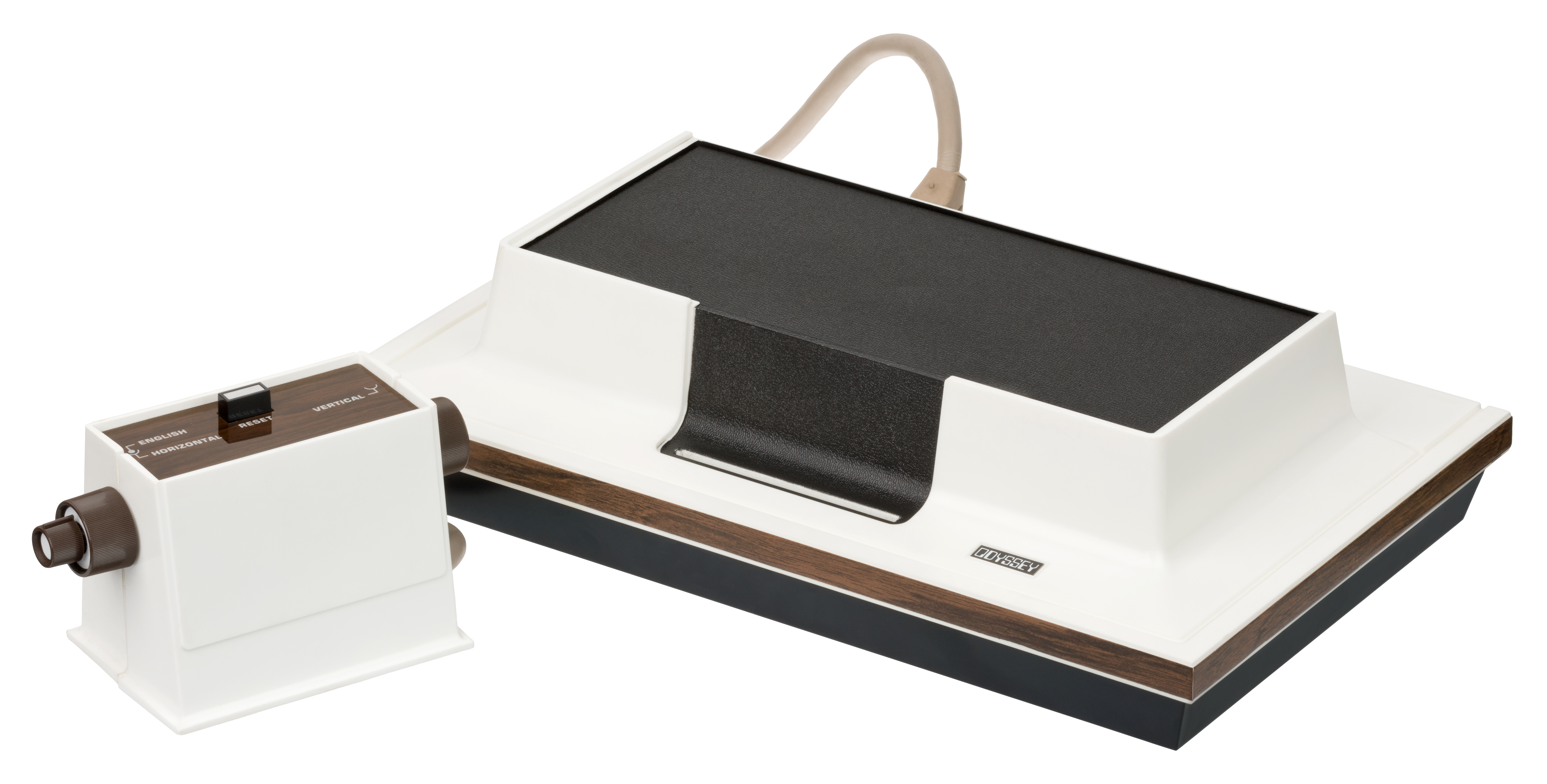
Ralph Baer's Magnavox Odyssey, the first video game console, released in 1972.

Video games—due to the great technological steps forward in computing since the second post-war period—are one of the new forms of entertainment that emerged in the 20th century alongside films.

- While already conceptualized in the 1940s–50s, video games only emerged as an industry during the 1970s, and then exploded into social and cultural phenomena in the late 1970s and early 1980s with the golden age of arcade video games, with notable releases such as Taito's Space Invaders in 1978, Atari, Inc.'s Asteroids in 1979, Namco's Pac-Man in 1980, Nintendo's Donkey Kong, Namco's Galaga, Konami's Frogger and Sega's Zaxxon in both 1981, Nintendo's Donkey Kong Jr. in 1982 and Capcom's 1942 in 1984, the worldwide success of Nintendo's Super Mario Bros. in 1985, Nintendo's The Legend of Zelda in 1986, Capcom's Mega Man in 1987, Sega's Sonic the Hedgehog in 1991 and the release in 1994, Sony PlayStation console, the first one to break the record of 100 million units sold, with Gran Turismo being the system's best selling video game.
- Video game design becomes a discipline. Some game designers in this century stand out for their work, such as Shigeru Miyamoto, Hideo Kojima, Sid Meier and Will Wright.

=== Art and architecture ===
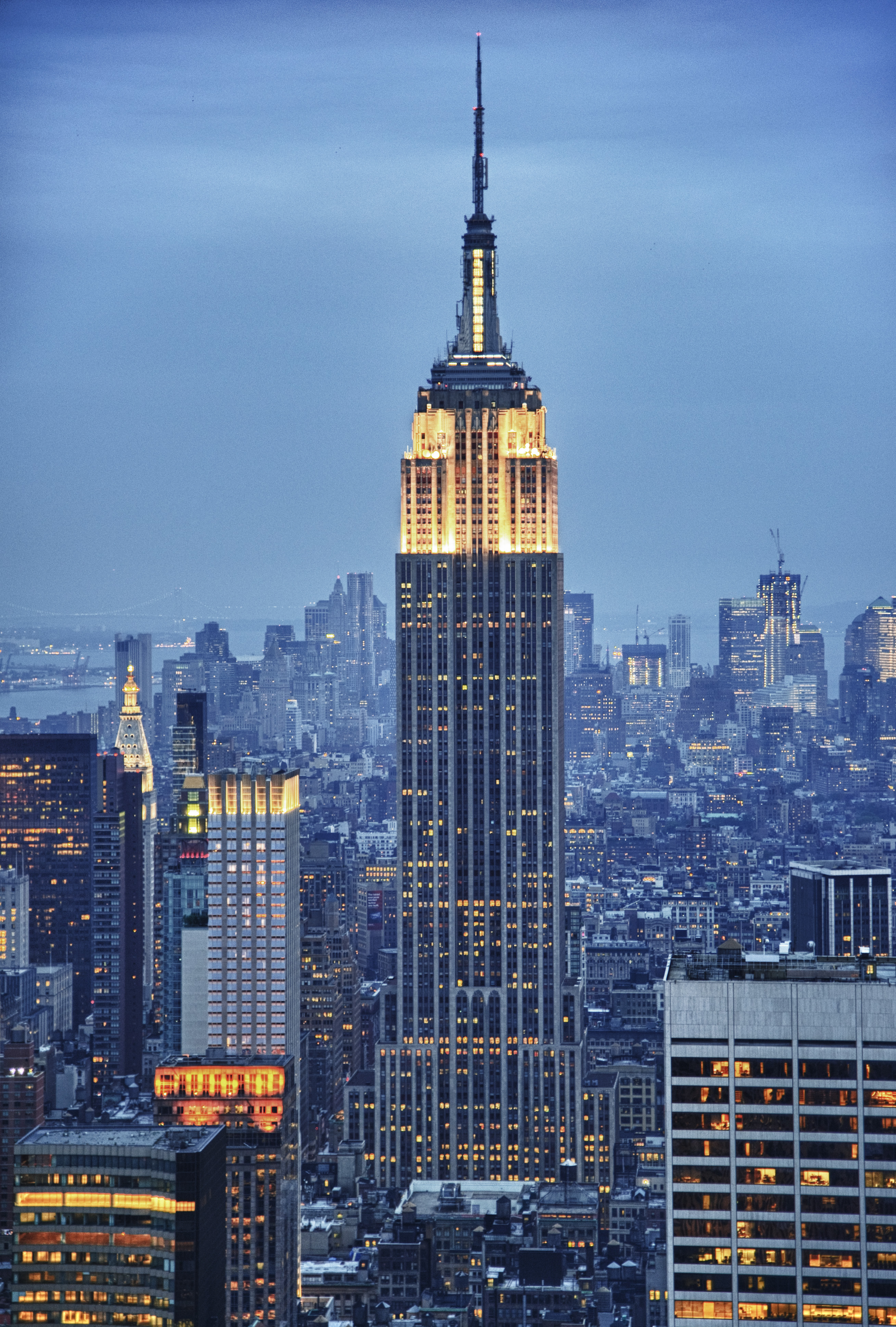
The Empire State Building is an iconic building of the 1930s.

- The art world experienced the development of new styles and explorations such as fauvism, expressionism, Dadaism, cubism, de stijl, surrealism, abstract expressionism, color field, pop art, minimal art, lyrical abstraction, and conceptual art.
- The modern art movement revolutionized art and culture and set the stage for both Modernism and its counterpart postmodern art as well as other contemporary art practices.
- Art Nouveau began as a form of architecture and design but fell out of fashion after World War I. The style is dynamic and inventive but unsuited to the depression of the Great War.
- In Europe, modern architecture departed from the decorated styles of the Victorian era. Streamlined forms inspired by machines became commonplace, enabled by developments in building materials and technologies. Before World War II, many European architects moved to the United States, where modern architecture continued to develop.
- The automobile increased the mobility of people in the Western countries in the early-to-mid-century, and in many other places by the end of the 20th century. City design throughout most of the West became focused on transport via car.

=== Sport ===
- The popularity of sport increased considerably—both as an activity for all and as entertainment, particularly on television.
- The modern Olympic Games, first held in 1896, grew to include tens of thousands of athletes in dozens of sports.
- The FIFA World Cup is first held in 1930 and is held every four years after World War II.
- American League Baseball is formed in 1900 and in 1903, both National and American agreed to play in the first World Series with over 100,000 in attendance.
- Boxing, also known as "Prize Fighting", became popular over this decade although bare-knuckle fighting is still popular.

== Science ==
=== Mathematics ===
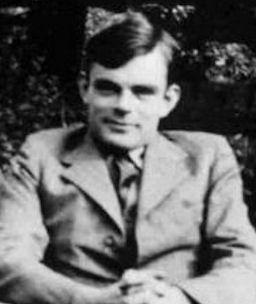
The pioneer of computer science, Alan Turing

Multiple new fields of mathematics were developed in the 20th century. In the first part of the 20th century, measure theory, functional analysis, and topology were established, and significant developments were made in fields such as abstract algebra and probability. The development of set theory and formal logic led to Gödel's incompleteness theorems.

Later in the 20th century, the development of computers led to the establishment of a theory of computation. Computationally-intense results include the study of fractals and a proof of the four color theorem in 1976.

=== Physics ===
- New areas of physics, like special relativity, general relativity, and quantum mechanics, were developed during the first half of the century. In the process, the internal structure of atoms came to be clearly understood, followed by the discovery of elementary particles.
- It is found that all the known forces can be traced to only four fundamental interactions. It is discovered further that two forces, electromagnetism and weak interaction, can be merged in the electroweak interaction, leaving only three different fundamental interactions.
- Discovery of nuclear reactions, in particular nuclear fusion, finally revealed the source of solar energy.
- Radiocarbon dating is invented, and became a powerful technique for determining the age of prehistoric animals and plants as well as historical objects.

=== Astronomy ===
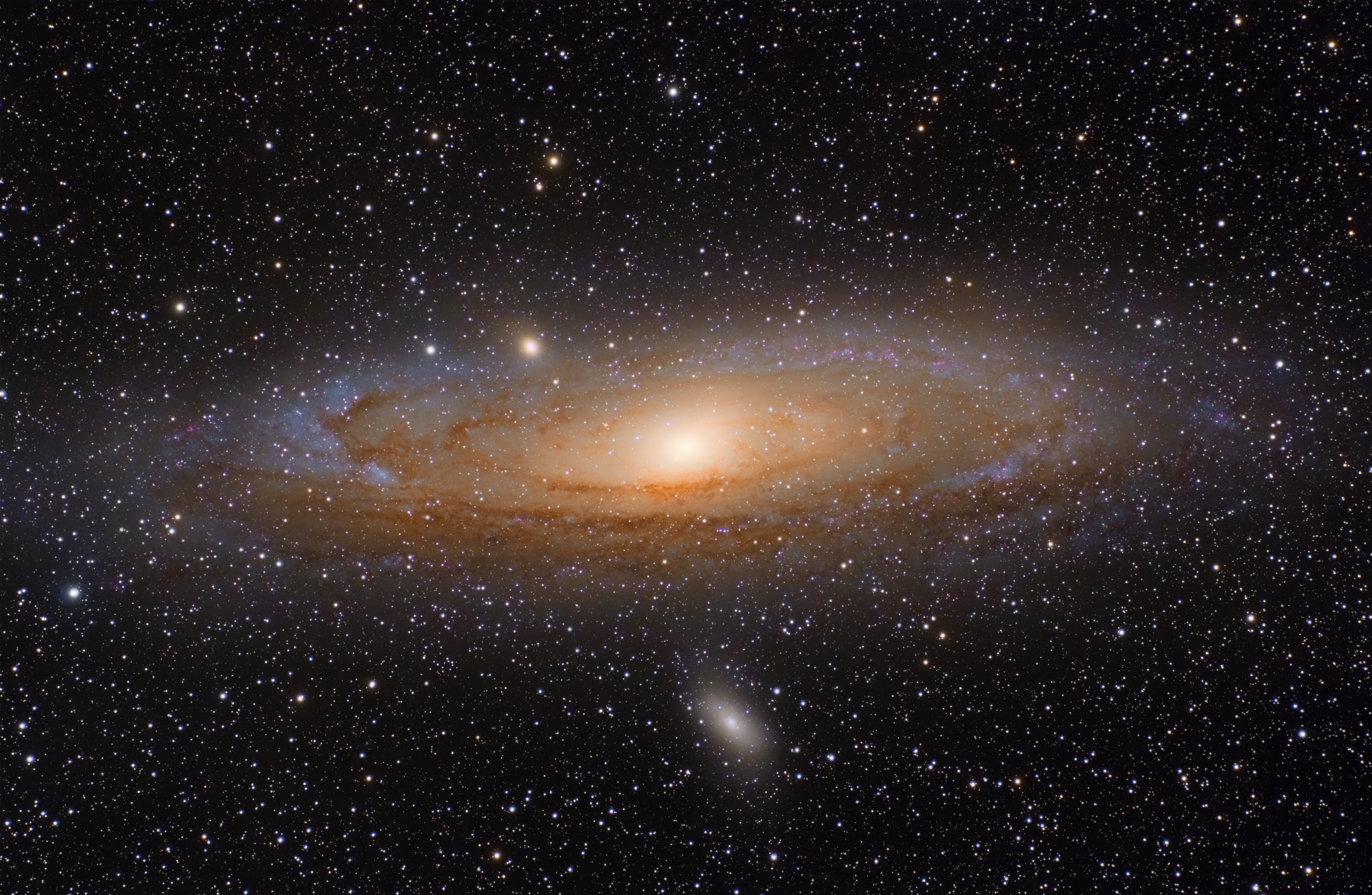
In 1924, Edwin Hubble announced that the Andromeda Nebula is actually a galaxy and that the Milky Way is just one of many galaxies in the universe.

- A much better understanding of the evolution of the universe is achieved, its age (about 13.8 billion years) is determined, and the Big Bang theory on its origin is proposed and generally accepted.
- The age of the Solar System, including Earth, is determined, and it turned out to be much older than believed earlier: more than 4 billion years, rather than the 20 million years suggested by Lord Kelvin in 1862.
- The planets of the Solar System and their moons were closely observed via numerous space probes. Pluto is discovered in 1930 on the edge of the Solar System, although in the early 21st century, it is reclassified as a dwarf planet instead of a planet proper, leaving eight planets.
- No trace of life is discovered on any of the other planets orbiting the Sun (or elsewhere in the universe), although it remained undetermined whether some forms of primitive life might exist, or might have existed, somewhere in the Solar System. Extrasolar planets were observed for the first time.

=== Agriculture ===
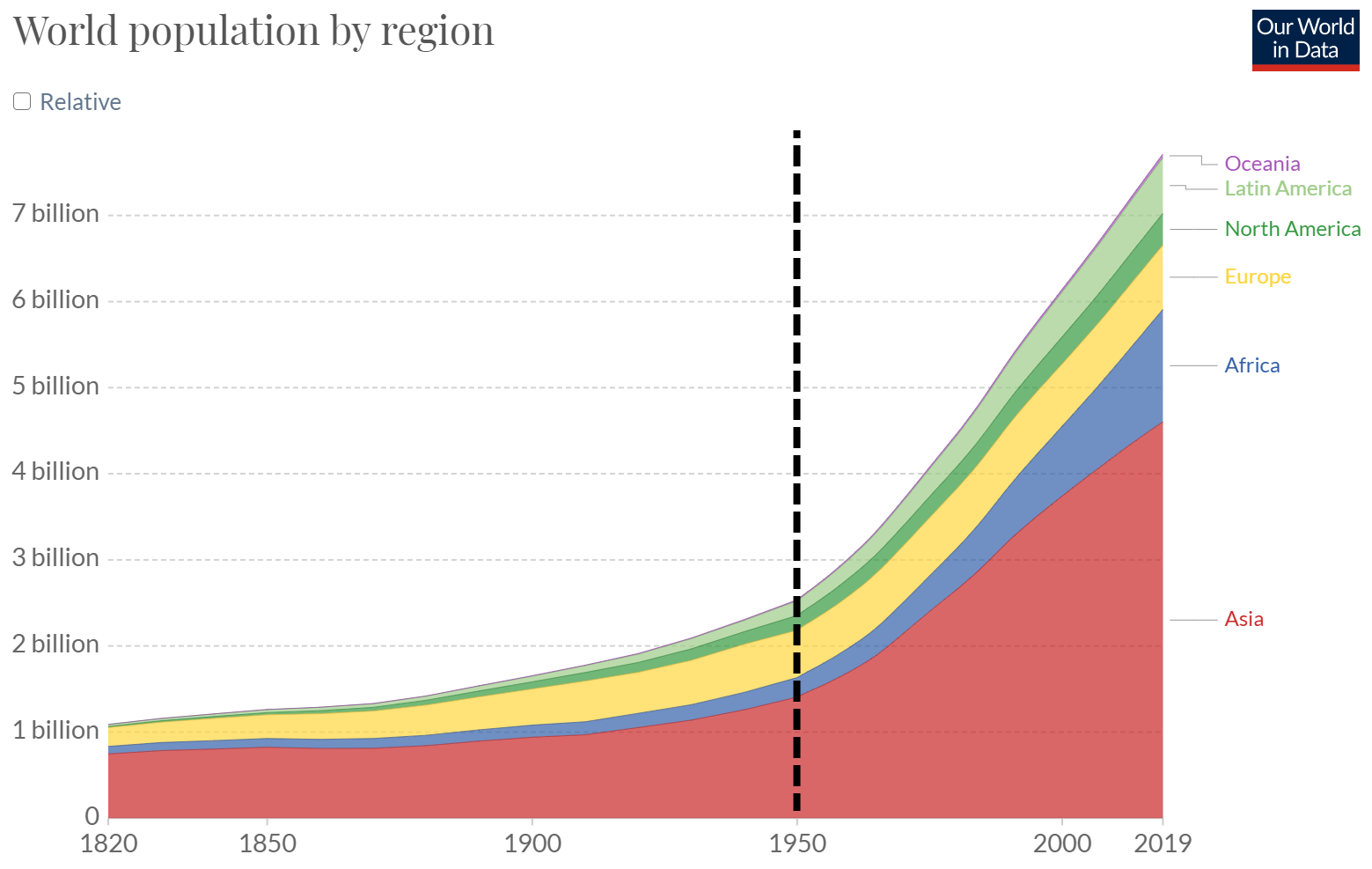
The 20th century saw an explosive increase in human population, rising from about 1.6 billion in 1900 to over 6 billion by 2000, with the Green Revolution (mid-20th century) being a key factor

- Norman Borlaug fathered the Green Revolution, the set of research technology transfer initiatives occurring between 1950 and the late 1960s that increased agricultural production in parts of the world, beginning most markedly in the late 1960s, and is often credited with saving over a billion people worldwide from starvation.

=== Biology ===
- Genetics is unanimously accepted and significantly developed. The structure of DNA is determined in 1953 by James Watson, Francis Crick, Rosalind Franklin and Maurice Wilkins, following by developing techniques which allow to read DNA sequences and culminating in starting the Human Genome Project (not finished in the 20th century) and cloning the first mammal in 1996.
- The role of sexual reproduction in evolution is understood, and bacterial conjugation is discovered.
- The convergence of various sciences for the formulation of the modern evolutionary synthesis (produced between 1936 and 1947), providing a widely accepted account of evolution.

=== Medicine ===
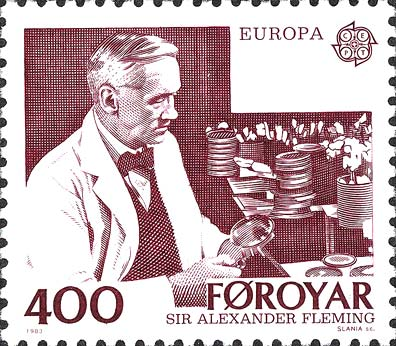
A stamp commemorating Alexander Fleming. His discovery of penicillin changed the world of medicine by introducing the age of antibiotics.

- Placebo-controlled, randomized, blinded clinical trials became a powerful tool for testing new medicines.
- Antibiotics drastically reduced mortality from bacterial diseases.
- A vaccine is developed for polio, ending a worldwide epidemic. Effective vaccines were also developed for a number of other serious infectious diseases, including influenza, diphtheria, pertussis (whooping cough), tetanus, measles, mumps, rubella (German measles), chickenpox, hepatitis A, and hepatitis B.
- Epidemiology and vaccination led to the eradication of the smallpox virus in humans. In 1980, the World Health Organization (WHO), through its Smallpox Eradication Programme (SEP) launched in 1966, officially declared smallpox eradicated, marking the first and only human disease to be eliminated globally.
- X-rays became a powerful diagnostic tool for a wide spectrum of diseases, from bone fractures to cancer. In the 1960s, computerized tomography is invented. Other important diagnostic tools developed were sonography and magnetic resonance imaging.
- Development of vitamins virtually eliminated scurvy and other vitamin-deficiency diseases from industrialized societies.
- New psychiatric drugs were developed. These include antipsychotics for treating hallucinations and delusions, and antidepressants for treating depression.
- The role of tobacco smoking in the causation of cancer and other diseases is proven during the 1950s (see British Doctors Study).
- New methods for cancer treatment, including chemotherapy, radiation therapy, and immunotherapy, were developed. As a result, cancer could often be cured or placed in remission.
- The development of blood typing and blood banking made blood transfusion safe and widely available.
- The invention and development of immunosuppressive drugs and tissue typing made organ and tissue transplantation a clinical reality.
- New methods for heart surgery were developed, including pacemakers and artificial hearts.
- Cocaine and heroin were widely illegalized after being found to be addictive and destructive. Psychoactive drugs such as LSD and MDMA were discovered and subsequently prohibited in many countries. Prohibition of drugs caused a growth in the black market drug industry, and expanded enforcement led to a larger prison population in some countries.
- Contraceptive drugs were developed, which reduced population growth rates in industrialized countries, as well as decreased the taboo of premarital sex throughout many western countries.
- The development of medical insulin during the 1920s helped raise the life expectancy of diabetics to three times of what it had been earlier.
- Vaccines, hygiene and clean water improved health and decreased mortality rates, especially among infants and the young.

==== Notable diseases ====
- An influenza pandemic, Spanish Flu, killed anywhere from 17 to 100 million people between 1918 and 1919.
- A new viral disease, called the Human Immunodeficiency Virus, or HIV, arose in Africa and subsequently killed millions of people throughout the world. HIV leads to a syndrome called Acquired Immunodeficiency Syndrome, or AIDS. Treatments for HIV remained inaccessible to many people living with AIDS and HIV in developing countries, and a cure has yet to be discovered.
- Because of increased life spans, the prevalence of cancer, Alzheimer's disease, Parkinson's disease, and other diseases of old age increased slightly.
- Changes in food production, along with sedentary lifestyles due to labor-saving devices and the increase in home entertainment, contributed to an "epidemic" of obesity, at first in the rich countries, but by the end of the 20th century spreading to the developing world.

=== Energy and the environment ===
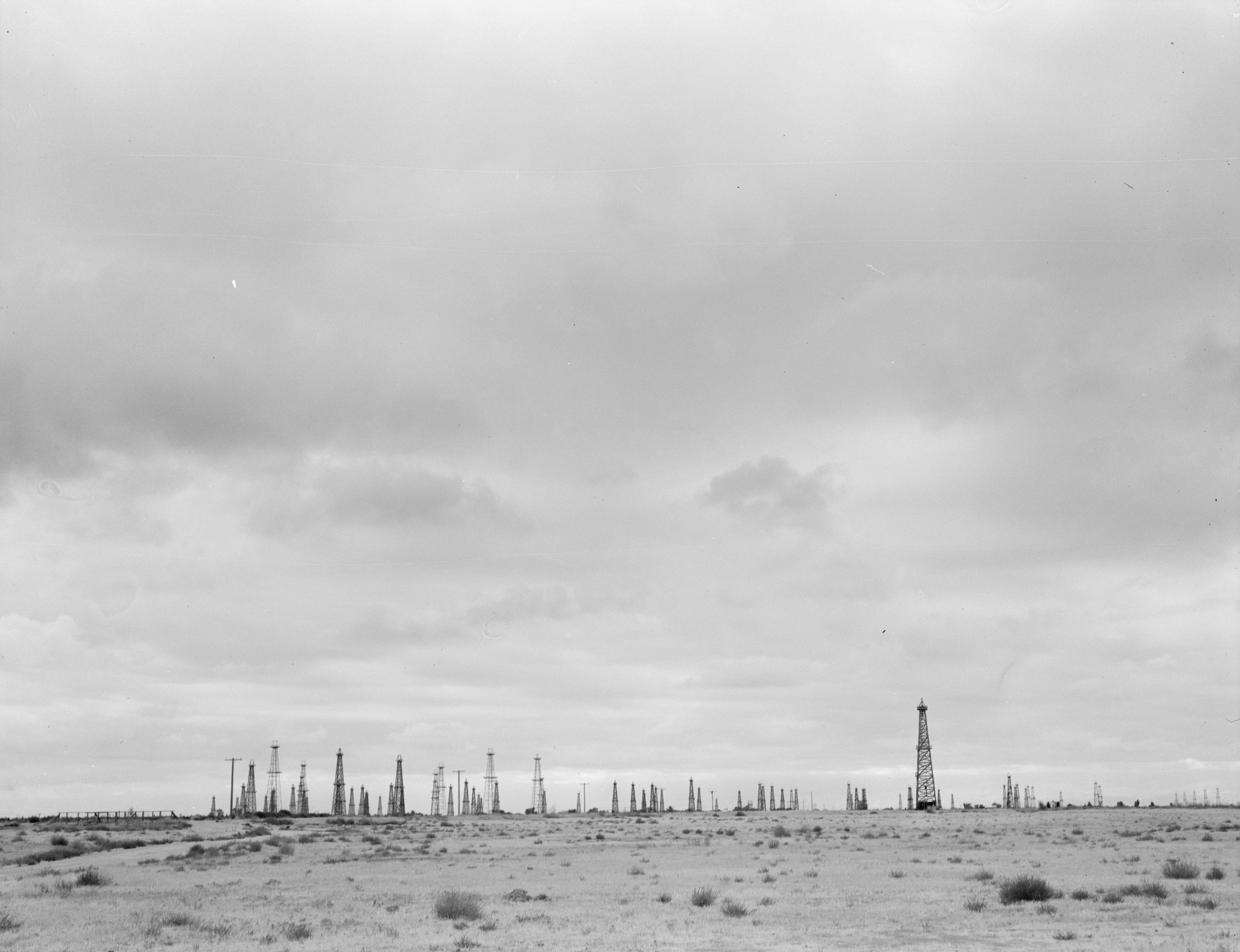
Oil field in California, US, in 1938. The first modern oil well is drilled in 1848 by the Russian engineer F.N. Semyonov, on the Apsheron Peninsula north-east of Baku.

- Fossil fuels and nuclear power were the dominant forms of energy sources.
- Widespread use of petroleum in industry—both as a chemical precursor to plastics and as a fuel for the automobile and airplane—led to the geopolitical importance of petroleum resources. The Middle East, home to many of the world's oil deposits, became a center of geopolitical and military tension throughout the latter half of the century. (For example, oil is a factor in Japan's decision to go to war against the United States in 1941, and the oil cartel, OPEC, used an oil embargo of sorts in the wake of the Yom Kippur War in the 1970s).
- The increase in fossil fuel consumption also fueled a major scientific controversy over its effect on air pollution, global warming, and global climate change.
- Pesticides, herbicides and other toxic chemicals accumulated in the environment, including in the bodies of humans and other animals.
- Population growth and worldwide deforestation diminished the quality of the environment.
- In the last third of the century, concern about humankind's impact on the Earth's environment made environmentalism popular. In many countries, especially in Europe, the movement is channeled into politics through Green parties. Increasing awareness of global warming began in the 1980s, commencing decades of social and political debate.

== Engineering and technology ==
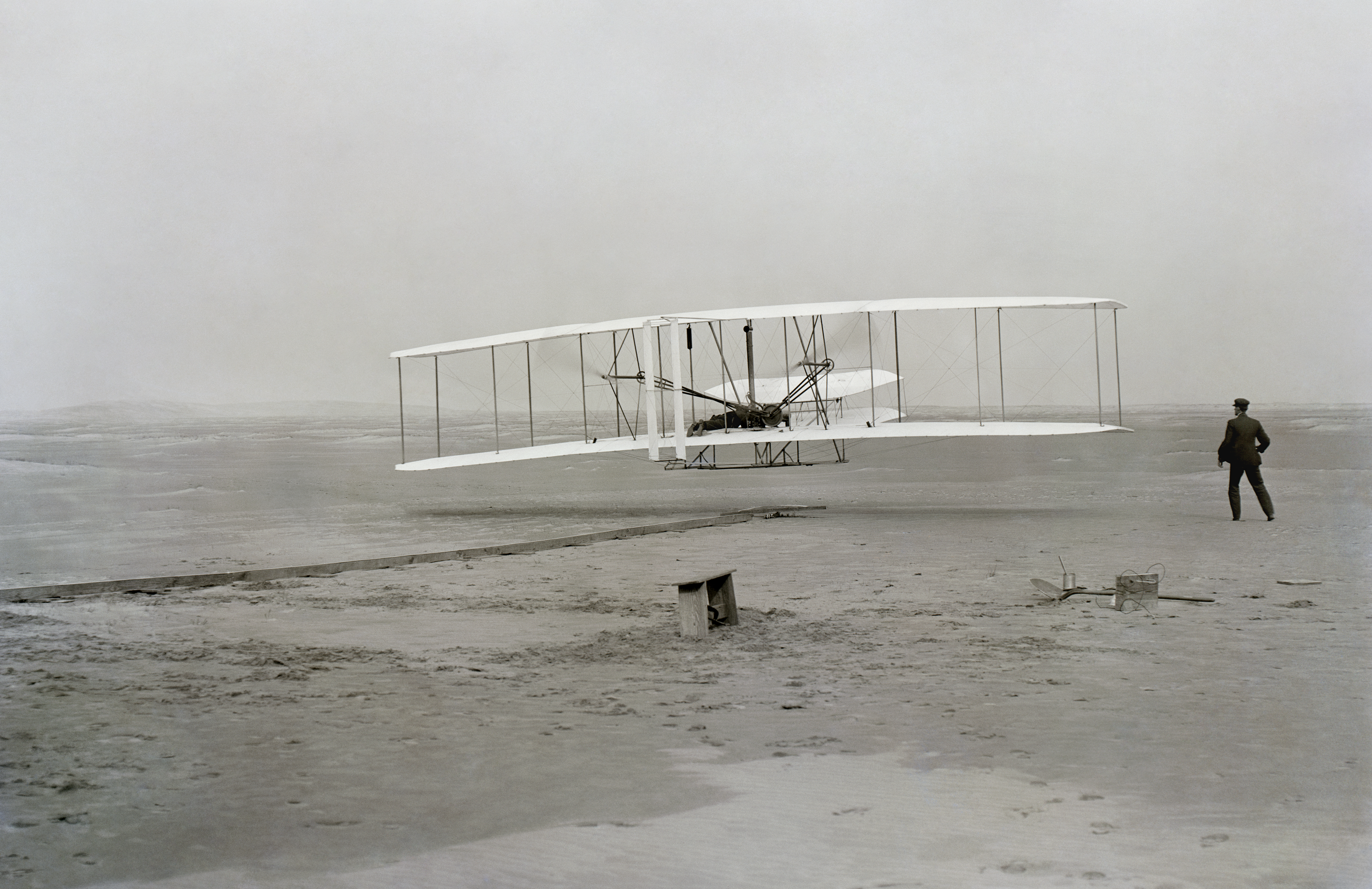
First flight of the Wright brothers' Wright Flyer on 7 December 1903 in Kitty Hawk, North Carolina, US; Orville piloting with Wilbur running at wingtip.

One of the prominent traits of the 20th century is the dramatic growth of technology. Organized research and practice of science led to advancement in the fields of communication, electronics, engineering, travel, medicine, and war.

- Basic home appliances including washing machines, clothes dryers, furnaces, exercise machines, dishwashers, refrigerators, freezers, electric stoves and vacuum cleaners became popular from the 1920s through the 1950s. Radios were popularized as a form of entertainment during the 1920s, followed by television during the 1950s.
- The first airplane, the Wright Flyer, is flown in 1903. With the engineering of the faster jet engine in the 1940s, mass air travel became commercially viable.
- The assembly line made mass production of the automobile viable. By the end of the 20th century, billions of people had automobiles for personal transportation. The combination of the automobile, motor boats and air travel allowed for unprecedented personal mobility. In western nations, motor vehicle accidents became the greatest cause of death for young people. However, expansion of divided highways reduced the death rate.
- The triode tube is invented, laying the foundation for amplification and switching technologies that led to silicon-based solid-state transistors, which revolutionized modern electronics.
- Air conditioning of buildings became common
- New materials, most notably stainless steel, Velcro, silicone, teflon, and plastics such as polystyrene, PVC, polyethylene, and nylon came into widespread use for many various applications. These materials typically have tremendous performance gains in strength, temperature, chemical resistance, or mechanical properties over those known prior to the 20th century.
- Aluminum became an inexpensive metal and became second only to iron in use.
- Thousands of chemicals were developed for industrial processing and home use.
- Digital computers came into use, they greatly increased productivity and paved the way for the Internet, which revolutionized global communication and information sharing.

=== Space exploration ===
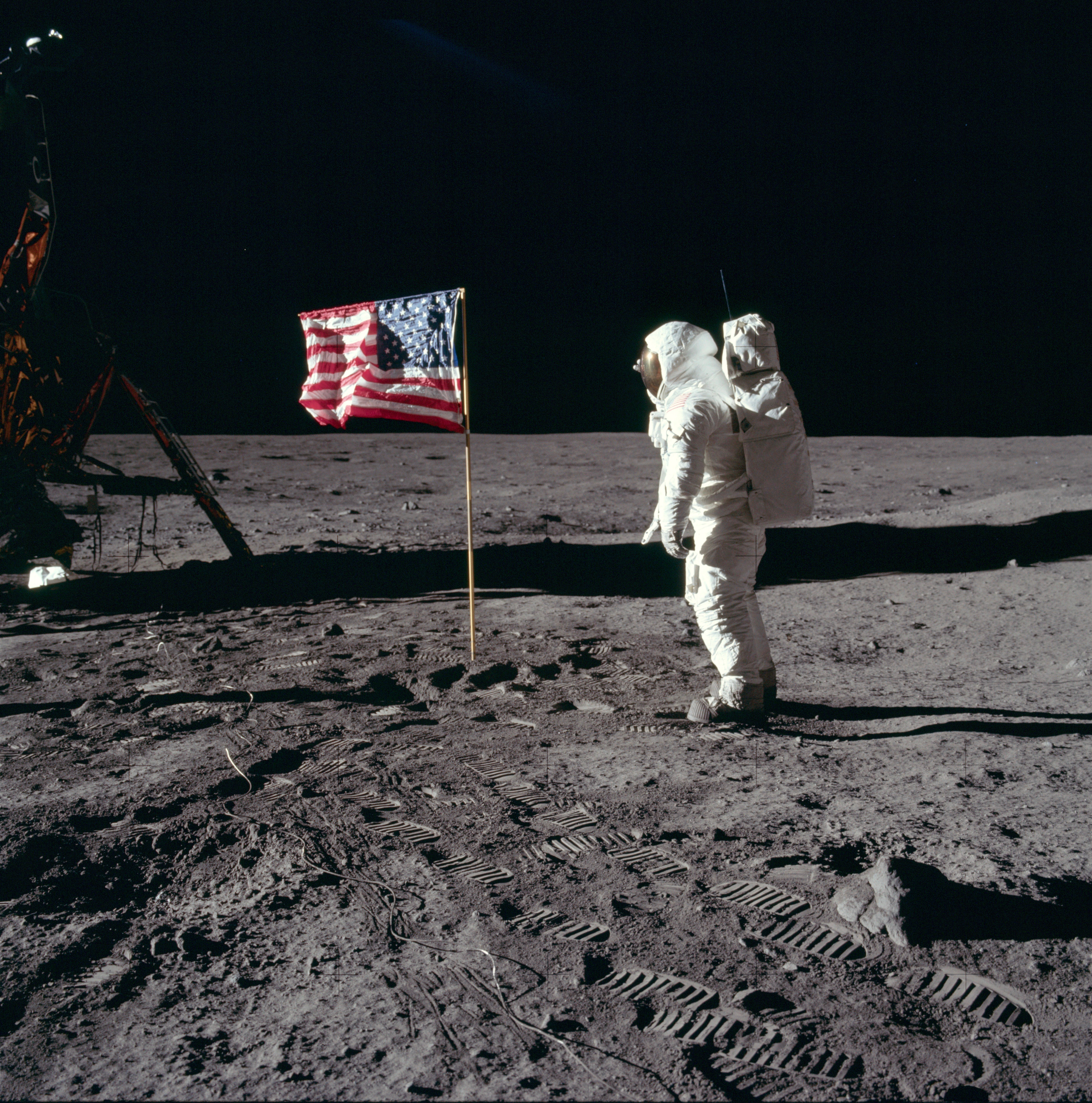
Photograph of the American astronaut Buzz Aldrin during the first moonwalk in 1969, taken by Neil Armstrong. The relatively young aerospace engineering industries rapidly grew in the 66 years after the Wright brothers' first flight.

- The Space Race between the United States and the Soviet Union gave a peaceful outlet to the political and military tensions of the Cold War, leading to the first human spaceflight with the Soviet Union's Vostok 1 mission in 1961, and man's first landing on another world—the Moon—with America's Apollo 11 mission in 1969. Later, the first space station is launched by the Soviet space program. The United States developed the first reusable spacecraft system with the Space Shuttle program, first launched in 1981. As the century ended, a permanent crewed presence in space is being founded with the ongoing construction of the International Space Station (ISS).
- In addition to human spaceflight, uncrewed space probes became a practical and relatively inexpensive form of exploration. The first orbiting space probe, Sputnik 1, is launched by the Soviet Union in 1957. Over time, a massive system of artificial satellites is placed into orbit around Earth. These satellites greatly advanced navigation, communications, military intelligence, geology, climate, and numerous other fields. Also, by the end of the 20th century, uncrewed probes had visited or flown by the Moon, Mercury, Venus, Mars, Jupiter, Saturn, Uranus, Neptune, and various asteroids and comets, with Voyager 1 being the farthest manufactured object from Earth at 23,5 billion kilometers away from Earth as of 6 September 2022, and together with Voyager 2 both carrying The Voyager Golden Record containing sounds, music and greetings in 55 languages as well as 116 images of nature, human advancement, space and society.
- The Hubble Space Telescope, launched in 1990, greatly expanded humanity's understanding of the Universe and brought brilliant images to TV and computer screens around the world.
- The Global Positioning System, a series of satellites that allow land-based receivers to determine their exact location, is developed and deployed.

== Religion ==
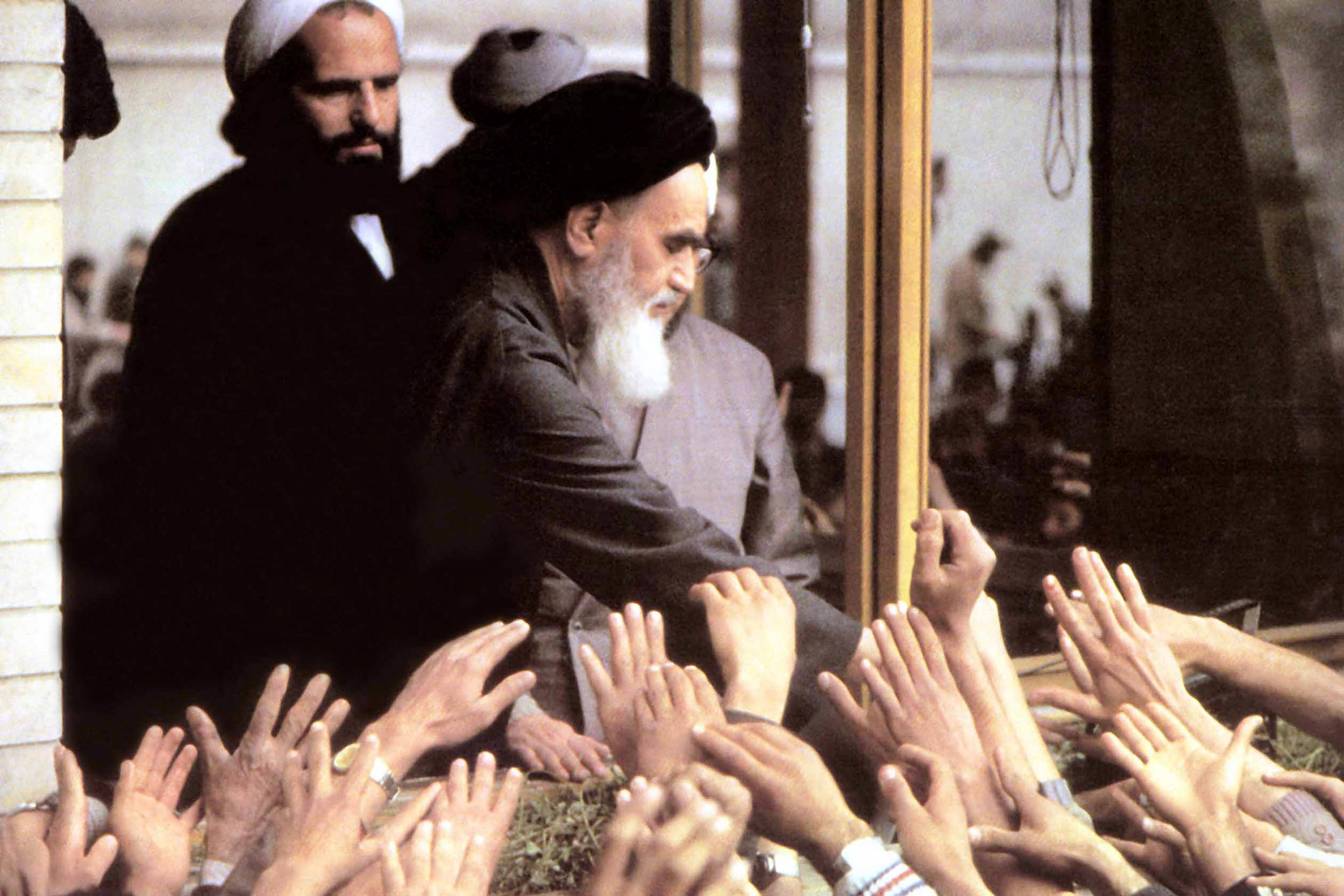
Ayatollah Ruhollah Khomeini was the Shia cleric who led the 1979 Iranian Revolution, overthrowing the Shah and establishing Iran as an Islamic Republic.

- 1900s – A number of related revival movements mark the start of Pentecostalism.
- 1904 – Aleister Crowley dictates The Book of the Law, the foundational text of Thelema.
- 1922 – The Soviet Union establishes a doctrine of state atheism.
- 1924 – Mustafa Kemal Pasha abolishes the Islamic Caliphate, in favor of secularism. This marks the last widely recognized Muslim Caliphate.
- 1930 – Wallace Fard Muhammad founds the Nation of Islam. The Seventh Lambeth Conference allows for the possibility of birth control within Anglicanism, the first example of a modern Christian church supporting such a position.
- 1940s – Wicca is formalized by Gerald Gardner and Doreen Valiente.
- 1950s – Sayyid Qutb articulates Qutbism, a violent variety of Islamism that would later become foundational to jihadist ideology. Maharishi Mahesh Yogi begins to teach Transcendental Meditation.
- 1953 – L. Ron Hubbard founds the Church of Scientology, which has a unique cosmology based on science fiction and his older system of Dianetics.
- 1956 – B. R. Ambedkar launches the Dalit Buddhist movement.
- 1960 – The charismatic movement starts within Anglicanism, quickly spreading to other Christian sects.
- 1962–65 – The Second Vatican Council is held, resulting in significant changes in the Catholic Church.
- 1970s – New Age beliefs and practices are popularized.
- 1979 – In Shia Islam, the Islamic Revolution establishes a theocratic state within Iran.
- 1988 – Al-Qaeda, a network of Islamic extremists, is founded among Arab members of the Afghan mujahideen. It engages in a number of terror attacks throughout the 1990s, leading up to the September 11 attacks in 2001.
- 1999 – Falun Gong, a Chinese new religious movement dating to the early 1990s, begins to be persecuted by the Chinese government.

== Economics ==
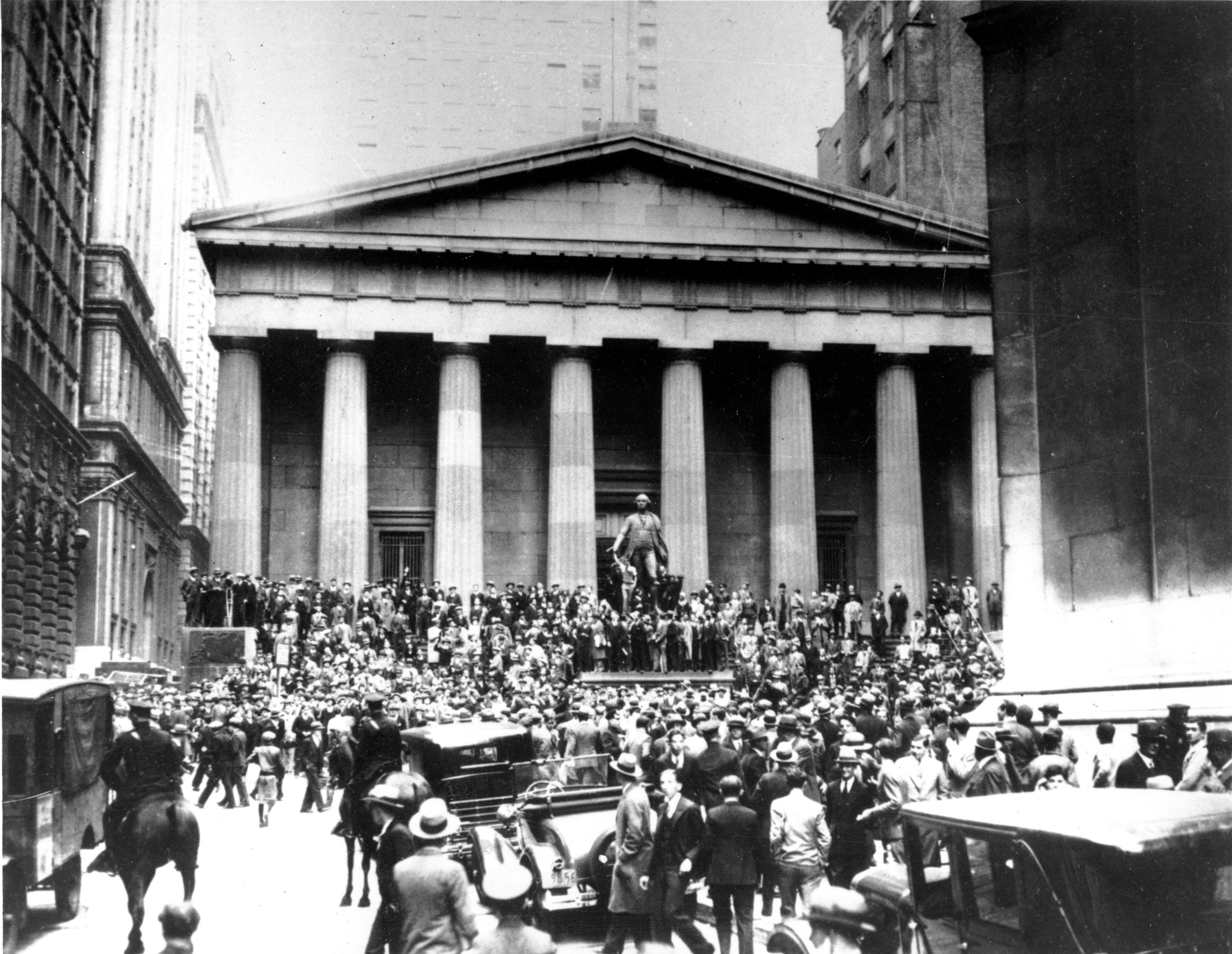
The Wall Street Crash of 1929 was a major factor contributing to the Great Depression

- The Great Depression is a worldwide economic slowdown that lasted throughout the early 1930s.
- The Soviet Union implemented a series of five-year plans for industrialization and economic development.
- Most countries abandoned the gold standard for their currency. The Bretton Woods system involved currencies being pegged to the United States dollar; after the system collapsed in 1971 most major currencies had a floating exchange rate.
- Economics is divided into two general economic schools: Keynesian and neoclassical
- The 1970s energy crisis occurred when the Western world, particularly the United States, Canada, Western Europe, Australia, and New Zealand, faced substantial petroleum shortages as well as elevated prices. The two worst crises of this period were the 1973 oil crisis and the 1979 energy crisis, when, respectively, the Yom Kippur War and the Iranian Revolution triggered interruptions in Middle Eastern oil exports.

== See also ==
- 19th century
- 21st century
- 20th-century inventions
- Death rates in the 20th century
- Infectious disease in the 20th century
- Modern art
- Timelines of modern history
- Timeline of the 20th century
- List of 20th-century women artists
- List of notable 20th-century writers
- List of battles 1901–2000
- List of stories set in a future now in the past

== Sources ==
- IPCC AR5 WG1 (2013), Stocker, T.F.; et al. (eds.), Climate Change 2013: The Physical Science Basis. Working Group 1 (WG1) Contribution to the Intergovernmental Panel on Climate Change (IPCC) 5th Assessment Report (AR5), Cambridge University Press. Climate Change 2013 Working Group 1 website.
- IPCC TAR WG2 (2001). McCarthy, J. J.; Canziani, O. F.; Leary, N. A.; Dokken, D. J.; White, K. S. (eds.). Climate Change 2001: Impacts, Adaptation and Vulnerability. Contribution of Working Group II to the Third Assessment Report of the Intergovernmental Panel on Climate Change. Cambridge University Press. ISBN 978-0521807685. Archived from the original on 14 May 2016. (pb: 0521015006)
- Bozarslan, Hamit [in French]; Duclert, Vincent [in French]; Kévorkian, Raymond H. (2015). Comprendre le génocide des arméniens—1915 à nos jours [Understanding the Armenian genocide: 1915 to the present day] (in French). Tallandier. ISBN 979-10-210-0681-2.
- Suny, Ronald Grigor (2015). "They Can Live in the Desert but Nowhere Else": A History of the Armenian Genocide. Princeton University Press. ISBN 978-1-4008-6558-1.
