= SUNY (disambiguation) =

SUNY may refer to...

- State University of New York
- Ronald Grigor Suny
- A takeoff on the name Sony as seen on TVs depicted in South Park. Which incidentally Sony's etymology came from the similarly spelt word "sunny".
