= Stalin: Passage to Revolution =

2020 book by Ronald Grigor Suny

- Cover
- Author: Ronald Grigor Suny
- Language: English
- Subject: Joseph Stalin
- Genre: Nonfiction
- Publisher: Stanford University Press
- Publication date: October 6, 2020
- Pages: 896
- Awards: Deutscher Memorial Prize (2021)
- ISBN: 9780691182032

Stalin: Passage to Revolution is a 2020 biography of Joseph Stalin by American historian, political scientist and academic Ronald Grigor Suny. The book won the 2021 Deutscher Memorial Prize.

== Summary ==
The biography delves into Joseph Stalin's formative years.

== Reviews ==
The book received praise for its research. It also received positive reviews for rejecting traditional explanations of Stalin, while receiving negative comments from some critics who felt it did do so or had failed to explain Stalin. Some critics also offered criticism of its writing.

=== Suny and Bergman's debate ===
In 2022, Suny wrote a review of James Ryan and Susan Grant's edited volume Revisioning Stalin and Stalinism: Complexities, Contradictions, and Controversies for the Russian Review. Jay Bergman wrote a letter to the editor in which he responded to and criticized Suny's review. Suny replied to Bergman's letter in May 2022.

== Awards ==
The book won the 2021 Deutscher Memorial Prize for his "research, writing, and scholarship, which is characterized by a serious and critical approach to Marxism and the Soviet experience." It also received an Honorable Mention from the Wayne S. Vucinich Book Prize.
