= They Can Live in the Desert but Nowhere Else =

2015 book by Ronald Grigor Suny

- First edition
- Author: Ronald Grigor Suny
- Language: English
- Subject: Armenian genocide
- Genre: Non-fiction
- Publisher: Princeton University Press
- Publication date: 2015
- Publication place: United States
- Pages: 520
- ISBN: 978-0-691-14730-7

"They Can Live in the Desert but Nowhere Else": A History of the Armenian Genocide is a book by Ronald Grigor Suny about the Armenian genocide, published by Princeton University Press in 2015. The book was praised as an accessible work that provides the academic consensus on why and how the Armenian genocide occurred.

== Contents ==
Suny used a statement from Talaat Pasha, as reported in U.S. Ambassador Henry Morgenthau's recollections, as the title of the book, indicating that the Armenian people are to be sent to the desert; the title was chosen to highlight the severity of the Ottoman state's actions.

The book focuses on the prehistory of the Armenian genocide and only covers the genocide itself in the final pages. It is based on a synthesis of previously published secondary sources; there is no bibliography present.

== Reception ==
Howard Eissenstat stated that the book is "the best and most accessible summary of this new consensus" that transcends nationalist narratives on the genocide and is "a remarkable work of history". Dan Stone called it an "engaging and thorough book" that was written "with skill and deep knowledge" and leaves the reader with no doubt that a genocide occurred, in contrast to the claims of some reviewers. Keith David Watenpaugh left a favorable review of the book, stating that it draws on the work of the Workshop for Armenian/Turkish Scholarship and succeeds in "incorporating the perspective of a descendant of the genocide’s victims". In International Affairs, Bill Park called the book a "painstakingly researched and highly readable work".

Historian Marc David Baer stated that it is a "superb work" and "the best narrative account explaining 'why, when, and how' the Armenian genocide occurred". Yair Auron said that Suny wrote "a comprehensive study of the Armenian Genocide" that "makes a clear scholarly contribution" and is also "very well written". According to historian Bedross Der Matossian the book's contribution "lies not in the presentation of new evidence proving genocidal intent, but in Suny’s unique ability to interpret and contextualize the event based on archival material in multiple languages". Matossian states that unlike previous books about the genocide, Suny's could be used as a textbook on the subject. According to Erdal Kaynar the book is "the most insightful and up-to-date analysis of the Armenian Genocide that exists".

Publishers Weekly stated that the work was made with a level of "detachment" even though members of Suny's family died in the genocide.
