= Workshop for Armenian/Turkish Scholarship =

Group of scholars

The Workshop for Armenian/Turkish Scholarship (WATS) is a group of scholars which is dedicated to transcending the nationalist historiography on the Armenian genocide and answering related questions. It first met in 2000. The workshop and the book it published (edited by Ronald Grigor Suny, Fatma Müge Göçek, and Norman Naimark) were widely praised as first-class scholarship that significantly advanced the field.

According to the workshop organizers, its Turkish participants faced state harassment for their participation.

== Works ==
- Suny, Ronald Grigor; Göçek, Fatma Müge; Naimark, Norman M., eds. (2011). A Question of Genocide: Armenians and Turks at the End of the Ottoman Empire. Oxford University Press. doi:10.1093/acprof:osobl/9780195393743.001.0001. ISBN 978-0-19-979276-4.
