= Ronald Grigor Suny =

American historian and political scientist (born 1940)

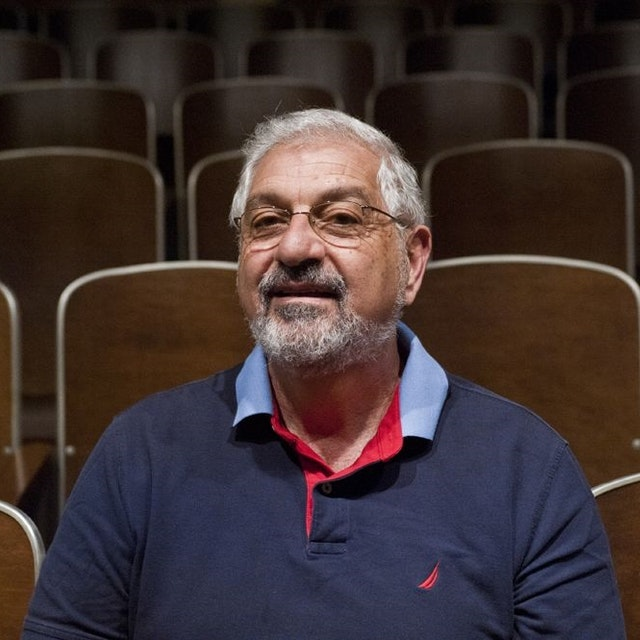
- Suny in 2013
- Born: September 25, 1940 (age 86)
- Occupations: Historian, academic, author
- Title: William H. Sewell Jr. Distinguished
- Relatives: Linda Suny Myrsiades (sister), Mesrop Kesdekian (uncle), Gurken (George) Suny (father), Arax Kesdekian Suny (mother), Grikor Mirzaian Suni (grandfather)

Academic background
- Education: Columbia University
- Doctoral advisor: Nina Garsoïan, Marc Raeff, Leopold H. Haimson

Academic work
- Discipline: History
- Sub-discipline: Soviet history, Armenian history, Russian history
- Institutions: University of Michigan
- Main interests: Marxism, Stalinism, Soviet history, Armenian history, Georgian and Caucasian history
- Notable works: Stalin: Passage to Revolution

Ronald Grigor Suny (born September 25, 1940) is an American Armenian historian and political scientist. He is the William H. Sewell Jr. Distinguished University Professor of History Emeritus at the University of Michigan and Emeritus Professor of history and political science at the University of Chicago. Suny served as director of the Eisenberg Institute for Historical Studies from 2009 to 2012; the Charles Tilly Collegiate Professor of Social and Political History at the University of Michigan from 2005 to 2015; and the William H. Sewell Jr. Distinguished University Professor of History from 2015 to 2022.

Suny was the first holder of the Alex Manoogian Chair in Modern Armenian History at the University of Michigan, after beginning his career as an assistant professor at Oberlin College. He served as chairman of the Society for Armenian Studies (SAS) in 1981 and 1984. He was elected president of the American Association for the Advancement of Slavic Studies (AAASS) in 2005 and given the Association for Slavic, East European, and Eurasian Studies (ASEEES) Distinguished Contributions to Slavic, East European, and Eurasian Studies Award in 2013. He has received the National Endowment for the Humanities Grant (1980–1981), the John Simon Guggenheim Memorial Fellowship (1983–1984), and a Research and Writing Grant, Program on Global Security and Sustainability, from the John D. and Catherine T. MacArthur Foundation (1998–1999), and was twice a fellow at the Center for Advanced Study in the Behavioral Sciences at Stanford (2001–2002, 2005–2006). He was a 2013 Berlin Prize Fellow at the American Academy in Berlin.

== Life ==
Suny was born to an Armenian family in Philadelphia. Growing up there and in Broomall, Pennsylvania, with his sister Linda Suny Myrsiades (b. 1941), Suny acted in plays both in high school and college as well as at his uncle Mesrop Kesdekian's summer stock theater, Green Hills Playhouse, outside of Reading, Pennsylvania. His interest in Russian and Soviet history and the history of the South Caucasus (Armenia, Azerbaijan, and Georgia) came from stories his father, Gurken (George) Suny (1910–1995), told about growing up in Tbilisi before and during the Russian Revolution. Although his father, a drycleaner and Armenian chorus director, was not involved in politics, he was sympathetic to the efforts to build socialism in the Soviet Union. His mother, Arax Kesdekian Suny (1917–2015), a homemaker who was also involved in family businesses, encouraged Suny to become a historian rather than an actor.

Suny graduated from Swarthmore College in 1962, and earned his Ph.D. from Columbia University in 1968 where he was trained primarily by the Armenian historian Nina Garsoïan, the Russian historian of the imperial period Marc Raeff, and the historian of the Social Democratic and workers' movement Leopold H. Haimson. His fields of study are the Soviet Union and post-Soviet Russia; nationalism; ethnic conflict; the role of emotions in politics; South Caucasus; and Russian/Soviet historiography.

He is a grandson of the Armenian composer Grikor Mirzaian Suni. In 1971 he and the pianist and Suzuki piano teacher Armena Pearl Marderosian (1949–2012) were married, and they had three children: Grikor Martiros Suni (1978–1980), the biologist Sevan Siranoush Suni (b. 1982) and the anthropologist Anoush Tamar Suni (b. 1987).

== Work ==
Suny first went to the USSR in the fall of 1964 with his uncle Ruben Suny and visited Yerevan and Moscow, as well as three cities – Baku, Leningrad, and Tashkent – where he had distant relatives on his father's side. The following year he spent ten months in Moscow and Yerevan on the official US-USSR cultural exchange program working on his dissertation on the revolution of 1917–1918 in Baku. His lifelong interest in the so-called "national question" was awakened by his experiences in the Caucasus and by the insights of his Soviet friend, journalist Vahan Mkrtchian, who pointed out that Soviet nationality policies had created rather than destroyed national consciousness and coherence in the non-Russian peoples. This approach radically contrasted with the orthodox view of Western social scientists during the Cold War that the Soviet treatment of non-Russians was "nation-destroying" repression and Russification. As a modernist, constructivist understanding of the making of nations became more acceptable in academia in the 1980s and 1990s, Suny elaborated this approach in a series of articles and later lectures in 1991 at Stanford University, which were revised and published in his book The Revenge of the Past: Nationalism, Revolution, and the Collapse of the Soviet Union (Stanford University Press, 1993). This new anti-primordialist paradigm became standard in the study of Soviet nationalities.

Having written books on all three South Caucasian nations, Suny turned to the history of the Armenians in the Ottoman Empire and accepted an offer from Princeton University Press to write a history of the Armenian genocide of 1915 for the centenary of the deportations and massacres during World War I. The book, "They Can Live in the Desert but Nowhere Else": A History of the Armenian Genocide (Princeton, NJ: Princeton University Press, 2015), won the Wayne S. Vucinich Book Prize from the ASEEES for the most important contribution to Russian, Eurasian, and East European studies in any discipline of the humanities or social sciences. Along with a Turkish colleague, Fatma Müge Göçek, and others, he organized and led the Workshop for Armenian/Turkish Scholarship (WATS), which in a series of ten conferences from 2000 to 2017 brought Armenian, Turkish, Kurdish, and other scholars together to investigate the Armenian genocide of 1915. For their work organizing WATS and fostering historical understanding between Armenians, Kurds, and Turks, Suny and Göçek were awarded the Middle East Studies Association Academic Freedom Award in 2005.

In the late 1980s, as the Soviet Union unravelled, Suny appeared numerous times as an expert in nationality issues on the McNeil-Lehrer News Hour, CBS Evening News, CNN, RTTV, Voice of America, and National Public Radio. He has written for The New York Times, The Los Angeles Times, The Nation, New Left Review, Dissent, the Turkish-Armenian newspaper in Istanbul Agos, and other newspapers and journals.

Suny's intellectual interests have centered on the non-Russian nationalities of the Russian Empire and the Soviet Union, particularly those of the South Caucasus (Armenia, Azerbaijan, and Georgia). The "national question" was a small area of study for many decades until peoples of the periphery mobilized themselves in the Gorbachev years. His aim has been to consider the history of imperial Russia and the USSR without leaving out the non-Russian half of the population, to see how multi-nationality, processes of imperialism and nation-making shaped the state and society of that vast country. This in turn has led to work on the nature of empires and nations, studies in the historiography and methodology of studying social and cultural history, and bridging the gap between the traditional concerns of historians and the methods and models of other social scientists. He worked for more than three decades on a biography of the young Stalin – Stalin: Passage to Revolution (Princeton University Press, 2020) – which won honorable mention in the competition for the Vuchinich Prize in 2021 and was awarded the Isaac and Tamara Deutscher Memorial Prize for the book which in the past year "exemplifies the best and most innovative new writing in or about the Marxist tradition." He is currently researching and writing a monograph, Forging the Nation: The Making and Faking of Nationalisms.

== Reception ==
Sebouh Aslanian described Looking toward Ararat as "arguably the most widely acclaimed work on Armenian history published in the West."

In Armenia, Suny, along with other diaspora Armenian scholars, was attacked for challenging the nationalist historiography of Soviet and post-Soviet writers in the Armenian republic. Zori Balayan considered Suny's Looking toward Ararat to be a pasquinade. In 1997, after an appearance at a conference at the American University of Armenia, Suny was accused by nationalist historians of lacking Armenian patriotism and using unverifiable evidence in his claim that Muslims dominated in the population of Yerevan at the turn of the twentieth century. Suny defended his view by arguing that the data came from imperial Russian censuses and had previously been used by serious Armenian historians in the West like George Bournoutian and Richard G. Hovannisian. In 1998, Armenian historian Armen Ayvazyan published the book The History of Armenia as Presented in American Historiography, a significant part of which was dedicated to criticizing Suny's Looking toward Ararat.

In March 2026, Suny and several other prominent scholars signed a petition in protest against the decision of Armenian Prime Minister Nikol Pashinyan to dismiss Edita Gzoyan, the director of the Armenian Genocide Museum-Institute at Tsitsernakaberd in Yerevan. Voicing their "deep concern" over the incident, the scholars expressed opposition to "the silencing of independent academic voices in favor of political convenience."

== Selected publications ==
- The Baku Commune, 1917–1918: Class and Nationality in the Russian Revolution (Princeton University Press, 1972);
- Armenia in the Twentieth Century (Scholars Press, 1983);
- The Making of the Georgian Nation (Indiana University Press, 1988, 1994);
- Looking toward Ararat: Armenia in Modern History (Indiana University Press, 1993);
- The Revenge of the Past: Nationalism, Revolution, and the Collapse of the Soviet Union (Stanford University Press, 1993);
- The Soviet Experiment: Russia, the USSR, and the Successor States (Oxford University Press, 1998, 2011).
- "Constructing Primordialism: Old Histories for New Nations," The Journal of Modern History Vol. 73, No. 4, December 2001
- "They Can Live in the Desert but Nowhere Else": A History of the Armenian Genocide. Princeton, NJ: Princeton University Press, 2015.
- The Hamidian Massacres, 1894–1897: Disinterring a Buried History. Études arméniennes contemporaines, 11, 125–134. 2018.
- Red Flag Unfurled: History, Historians and the Russian Revolution (Verso Books, 2017).
- Red Flag Wounded: Stalinism and the Fate of the Soviet Experiment (Verso Books, 2020).
- Stalin: Passage to Revolution (Princeton University Press, 2020)

Co-author

- with Valerie A. Kivelson, Russia's Empires (Oxford University Press, 2017).

=== Editor ===
- Transcaucasia, Nationalism and Social Change: Essays in the History of Armenia, Azerbaijan, and Georgia (Michigan Slavic Publications, 1983; University of Michigan Press, 1996) and
- The Structure of Soviet History: Essays and Documents (Oxford University Press, 2003, 2013);
- The Cambridge History of Russia, vol. 3: The Twentieth Century (Cambridge University Press, 2006).

=== Coeditor ===
- Party, State, and Society in the Russian Civil War: Explorations in Social History (Indiana University Press, 1989);
- The Russian Revolution and Bolshevik Victory: Visions and Revisions (D. C. Heath, 1990);
- Making Workers Soviet: Power, Culture, and Identity (Cornell University Press, 1994);
- Becoming National (Oxford University Press, 1996);
- Intellectuals and the Articulation of the Nation (University of Michigan Press, 1999);
- A State of Nations: Empire and Nation-making in the Age of Lenin and Stalin (Oxford University Press, 2001).

Awards
Preceded by John Bellamy Foster	Deutscher Memorial Prize; 2021	Succeeded by coming soon
