= Cizre Bridge =

Cizre Bridge Cizre Köprüsü
- Coordinates: 37.1957°N 42.1135°E
- Carries: 2 lanes of D.400
- Crosses: Tigris
- Locale: Cizre, Şırnak Province
- Owner: Cizre Municipality

Characteristics
- Total length: 220 m (720 ft)
- Width: 11 m (36 ft)

History
- Opened: 1968

Location
- Interactive map of Cizre Bridge

The Cizre Bridge (Turkish: Cizre Köprüsü, Kurdish: Pira Cizîrê) is a 220 m (720 ft) long deck-arch bridge, carrying the D.400 across the Tigris river in Cizre, Turkey.

The bridge was built as part of the Turkish State Highway System to improve mobility in the region. Prior to its construction, the only way to cross the Tigris river in Cizre was via car-ferries that caused congestion. With the rising usage of the automobile in Turkey in the 1950s and 1960s, the need for an uninterrupted crossing grew. The Cizre Bridge was completed in 1968 and at the time was the 2nd longest vehicular bridge in Turkey, after the Birecik Bridge. A request to name the structure Kennedy Bridge was put forward in 1963, but the request was denied.

The 1968 bridge is 1.35 kilometres (0.84 mi) northwest of the ruined Roman-era Ain Diwar Bridge, across the border in Syria.
