= Selim Acar =

Turkish businessman

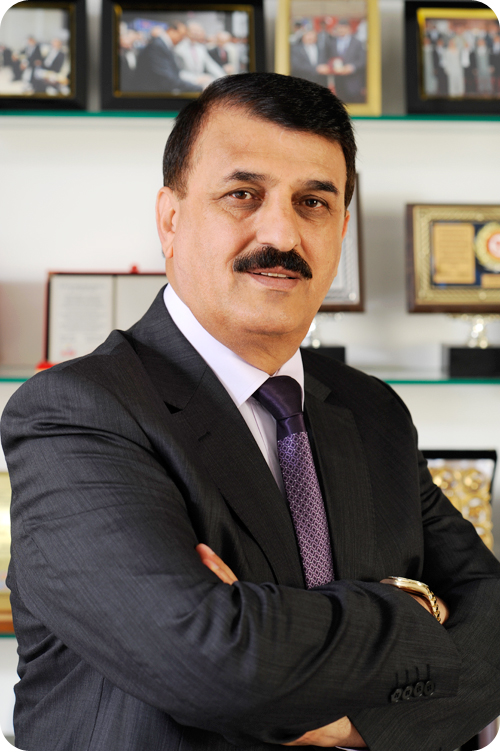
- Born: Selim Acar; 1961 (age 64–65); Cizre, Şırnak, Turkey
- Occupation: Business man
- Organization: Acarsan Holding

Selim Acar (d. 1961; Cizre, Şırnak, Turkey) is a Turkish business man, the founder of Acarsan Holding and the chairman of the board of directors.

== Early life ==
He was the 7th child of Fatma Acar and Ramazan Acar who worked as a farmer in Cizre. He moved to Gaziantep with his family in 1992.

== Career ==
In 1998, he built a flour and semolina factory in the Gaziantep Organized Industrial Zone and exported products to Iraq, Libya, Middle East and North African countries. In 2005, he acquired a franchise of Scania Truck from Doğuş Group. In 2007, he opened the TUV - TURK inspection stations at five different Southeas centers in Mardin, Nusaybin, Siirt, Sirnak and Cizre. In 2008, he received the commitment of contracted training and research hospitals a total of 750 million dollars from the Iraqi Ministry of Health. In 2009, he acquired Audi Gaziantep Dealership from Doğuş Group and opened its showroom building. In addition to the flour and semolina plant in 2015, he opened modern pasta plants with Italian technology. He served as a member of TUSIAD, member of TIM Assembly, member of Southeastern Anatolian Exporters Association (GAİB), member of Foreign Economic Relations Board (DEIK), Deputy Chairman of Syrian, Iraqi and Lebanese Business Councils. He participated in Turkish - Iraq Friendship Association and Gaziantepspor Board of Directors. He continues his career at Acarsan Holding, where he is the founder and chairman of the board of directors.
