= Flavianus Michael Malke =

Eastern Catholic prelate and beatified martyr

Blessed Bishop Flavianus Michael Malke
- Eparch of Gazireh
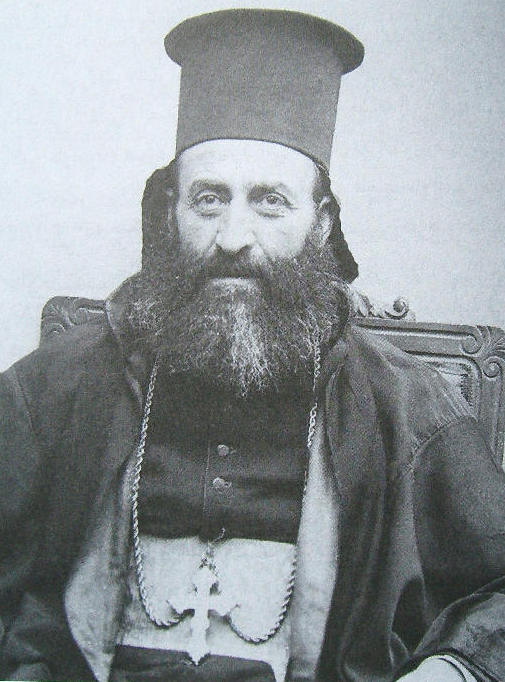
- Bet. 1913-5.
- Diocese: Gazireh
- See: Gazireh
- In office: 19 January 1913 - 28 August 1915
- Predecessor: Julius Behnam Aqrawi
- Successor: None; suppressed

Orders
- Ordination: 13 May 1883 by Ignatius George V Shelhot
- Consecration: 19 January 1913 by Ignatius Ephrem II Rahmani

Personal details
- Born: Ya'Qūb Melkī; 1858 Kalat’ül Mara, Ottoman Empire (now in Turkey)
- Died: 29 August 1915 (aged 55–56) Cizre, Ottoman Empire (now in Turkey)

Sainthood
- Feast day: 29 August
- Venerated in: Roman Catholic Church; Eastern Catholic Church
- Title as Saint: Blessed
- Beatified: 29 August 2015; Harissa, Lebanon by Cardinal Angelo Amato
- Attributes: Bishop's attire; Crucifix
- Patronage: Persecuted Christians

Flavianos Michael Malke (Syriac: ܦܠܒܝܐܢܘܣ ܡܝܟܐܝܠ ܡܠܟܝ, Flavyānus Mikhayil Malké), born Ya'Qūb Melkī; (1858 – 29 August 1915) was an Eastern Catholic prelate of the Brothers of Saint Ephrem of a Syriac background. He became the Syrian Catholic eparch of Gazarta (modern Cizre). Malke was killed in Gazarta during the Assyrian genocide after he refused to convert to Islam.

On 8 August 2015, Pope Francis approved his beatification after he determined that Malke was killed in hatred of the faith. He was beatified on 29 August 2015, the centenary of his martyrdom.

== Biography ==
Malke was born in Kalat’ül Mara, a village to the east of Mardin, Turkey, in the Ottoman Empire. He belonged to a family from the Syriac Orthodox Church which hails from Kharput. In 1868, he joined the Saffron Monastery where he studied Aramaic, Arabic and Turkish beside theology. He was consecrated a deacon in 1878 and a secretary of the library and a teacher in the monastery's school.

He leaned towards Eastern Catholicism and subsequently joined the Syriac Catholic Charafe Monastery school spending four years. He was ordained a priest in Aleppo on 13 May 1883 and was assigned to various villages in Tur Abdin. His church and house were sacked and burned in 1895 during the Hamidian massacres in Diyarbekir Vilayet, during which Father Flavianus' mother and many other members of his parish were murdered.

Over the following years he served as a visiting priest in several sacked and burned villages in Tur Abdin, where he helped with rebuilding efforts. Due to his works, Malke was ordained Chorbishop in 1897 and vice bishop of Mardin and Gazarta. On 19 Januari 1913, he was consecrated a bishop together with the future Syriac Catholic Patriarch of Antioch Gabriel Tappuni in Beirut.

In the summer of 1915, during the height of the Armenian Genocide, in the rural region Tur Abdin, Malke, who was in Azakh at the time, returned to Gazarta upon hearing news of the impending Assyrian genocide and refused to flee despite being advised so by local Turkish and Kurdish Muslim leaders. He was arrested by Ottoman authorities on 28 August 1915, alongside the Chaldean bishop of the city, Philippe-Jacques Abraham. According to Muslim eyewitnesses they were given choice between death or conversion to Islam. Upon their refusal, Bishop Jacques Abraham was immediately shot dead and Bishop Michael Malke was beaten senseless and then beheaded.

== Beatification ==
In 2010, the Syriac Catholic Patriarch launched a request for the beatification of Malke. He was declared Servant of God by the Holy See, which is the first step towards sainthood.

On Sunday, 30 September 2012, a report was submitted to Rome by the Syriac Catholic Patriarch for Mar Michael Malke's beatification.

On 8 August 2015, his beatification was approved after Pope Francis determined that Melki was killed In odium fidei ("Out of Hatred of the Catholic Faith"). Cardinal Angelo Amato - on behalf of the pope - presided over the beatification in Lebanon on 29 August 2015.

== See also ==
- Philippe-Jacques Abraham
- Ignatius Maloyan
