= Mu'izz al-Din Mahmud =

- Emir of Jazirat Ibn 'Umar
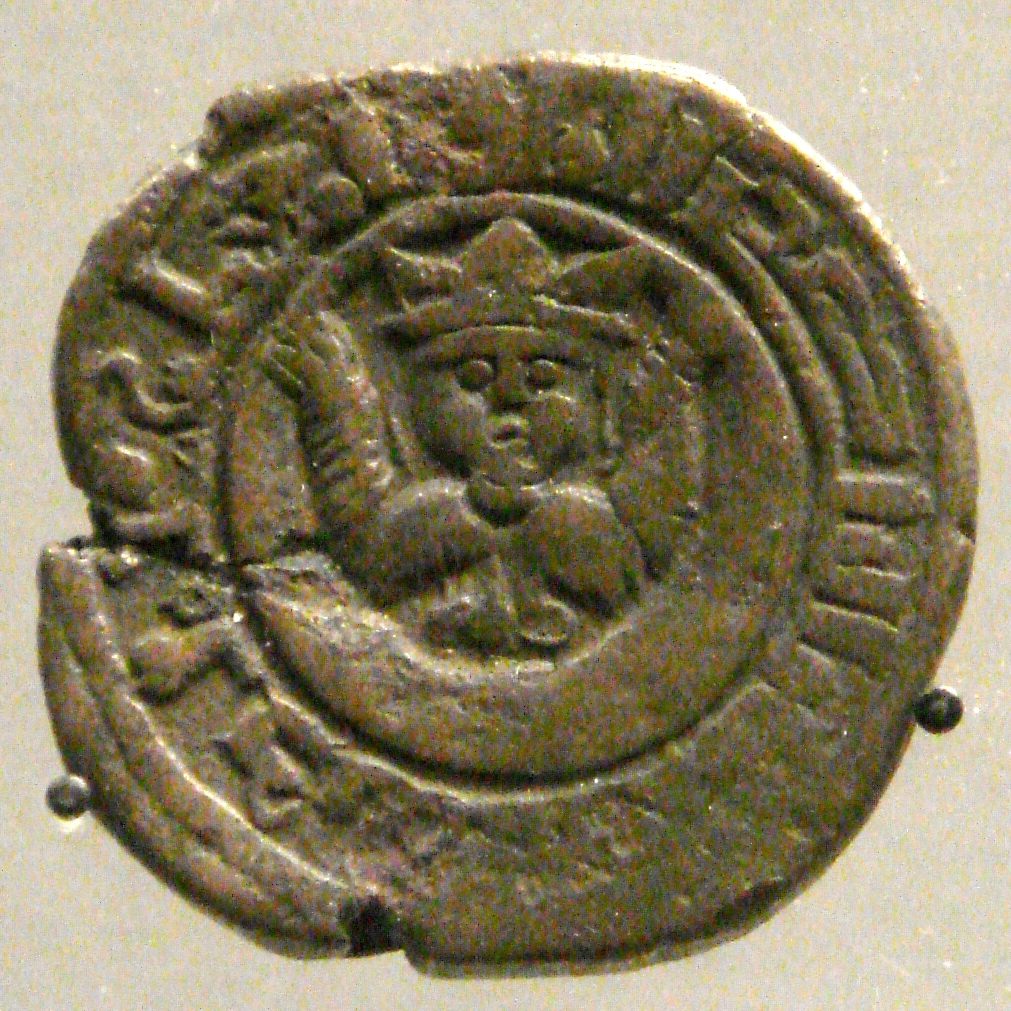
- Coin of Mu'izz ad-Din Mahmud, with representation of the moon, mint of Jazirat Ibn 'Umar, 1219.
- Rule: 1208 – 1250/51
- Predecessor: Mu'izz al-Din Sanjar Shah
- Successor: al-Mas'ud Shahanshah (only briefly), Badr al-Din Lu'lu'
- Died: 1250/51
- House: Zengid
- Father: Mu'izz al-Din Sanjar Shah
- Religion: Sunni Islam

Mu'izz al-Din Mahmud was the Zengid Emir of Jazirat Ibn 'Umar (present-day Cizre) from 1208 to 1250/51. One of the last Zengid rulers, Mahmud succeeded his infamous father, Mu'izz al-Din Sanjar Shah, as the ruler of a minor Zengid principality. Contemporary sources described Mahmud's extreme cruelty but otherwise say very little about his reign. He seems to have successfully navigated a complex political landscape and formed an alliance with Badr al-Din Lu'lu', the ruler of Mosul. After Mahmud's death, Badr al-Din Lu'lu' appears to have had his son killed and annexed Jazirat Ibn 'Umar to his own territory.

== Background and ancestry ==
Mahmud's full name was Abu'l-Qasim Mahmud ibn Sanjar Shah. He was the second son of Mu'izz al-Din Sanjar Shah, who was himself the son of Sayf al-Din Ghazi II, the Zengid atabeg of Mosul. Sayf al-Din Ghazi also married the daughter of his more famous uncle Nur al-Din Zengi, so Mu'izz al-Din Mahmud may have been descended from him as well.

The Zengids of Jazirat Ibn 'Umar originated in 1180, when Sayf al-Din Ghazi II died while his sons were still young. As a result, his brother Izz al-Din Mas'ud I took over as ruler of Mosul, while Ghazi's sons were given Jazirat Ibn 'Umar as a principality instead.

== Reign ==
Contemporary sources recorded little about Mahmud's life except for a few basics about his birth, succession, and death. However, they clearly regarded him as "a despicable human being". Ibn al-Athir recorded that, when Mahmud succeeded his father as emir of Jazirat Ibn 'Umar, he had his brother Ghazi's body "thrown to the dogs" before burial. Mahmud also reportedly drowned most of his father's concubines (surriyya or jariya) when he came to power. Ibn al-Athir wrote that his own surriyya or jariya had previously worked for Mahmud, and she had seen him "burning the faces of several of his father's concubines before throwing them into the river".

Although little of Mahmud's reign is described by contemporary sources, he seems to have been relatively successful at navigating the complex politics of the time: he was on good terms with the Abbasid caliph, the Ayyubids of Syria, and the ruler of Mosul, Badr al-Din Lu'lu'. At some point, he secured an alliance with Badr al-Din Lu'lu' by marrying his son, al-Mas'ud Shahanshah, to Badr al-Din's daughter. After Mahmud died in 1250/51, however, the marriage fell apart – Badr al-Din imprisoned al-Mas'ud Shahanshah and put him on a boat from Jazirat Ibn 'Umar to Mosul; al-Mas'ud Shahanshah died on the way, and most contemporary chroniclers wrote that he was drowned on Badr al-Din's orders.

== Attestations from physical objects ==
Several contemporary objects bear Mu'izz al-Din Mahmud's name. The best-known of these are the double doors of the congregational mosque in Cizre. The mosque was originally built in 1155 and repaired sometime in the early 13th century; the doors were added at this point. The wooden doors feature brass overlays in the shape of twelve-pointed stars and bronze knockers in the shape of dragons. The doors are now at the Museum of Turkish and Islamic Arts in Istanbul.

The so-called "MIA ewer" (after the Museum of Islamic Art in Doha) also has an inscription with Mu'izz al-Din Mahmud's name. Based on stylistic similarities, James Allan and Ruba Kana'an have both argued that this ewer was likely made in the workshop of Ibrahim ibn Mawaliya in Mosul. According to Kana'an, the MIA ewer was probably "a ready-made, mass-produced object bought in a market before it was decorated", and the buyer would have only chosen how it was decorated. Although Mahmud's name is on the ewer, it is unclear who the original buyer would have been – it could have been a gift to him, rather than his own commission. One possibility is that the ewer was a gift from Badr al-Din Lu'lu', who is known to have sent such inlaid ewers as diplomatic gifts to other rulers.

Another object bearing Mahmud's name is a brass basin inlaid with silver, now at the Museum of Islamic Art in Berlin. The basin's decoration is relatively simple, consisting solely of an inscription interlaced with a knot pattern. It is not stylistically similar to the contemporary metalwork attributed to Mosul.

A number of copper coins with Mahmud's name, minted at Jazirat Ibn 'Umar during his reign, have also survived. A particular emblem, or tamgha, shaped like a "double-ended anchor", seems to have been used on coins by the Zengid sub-dynasties of Jazirat Ibn 'Umar and Sinjar. Mahmud's father Sanjar Shah used this design on his coins, and at least one of Mahmud's does as well (dated to 1241). However, some of Mahmud's earlier coins depict a seated figure holding a crescent moon – a design typical of coins from Zengid Mosul. This variation was likely for political reasons: the contemporary biographer Ibn al-Fuwati wrote that, for the weaker Zengid rulers at Jazirat Ibn 'Umar and Shahrazur, their relationship with the more powerful ruler of Mosul was reflected in the designs on their coins.

== See also ==
- Zengid dynasty

Regnal titles
Preceded by Mu'izz al-Din Sanjar Shah	Emir of Jazirat Ibn 'Umar; 1208–1251	Succeeded by Badr al-Din Lu'lu'
