= Nuran İmir =

Kurdish politician (born 1977)

Member of the Grand National Assembly
- In office 8 July 2018 – 14 May 2023
- Constituency: Şırnak (2018)

Personal details
- Born: 1977 (age 48–49) Cizre, Turkey
- Party: HDP

Nuran İmir (born 1977, Cizre) is a Kurdish politician of Peoples' Democratic Party (HDP) and a member in the Grand National Assembly of Turkey. Having been a member of the Peoples Democracy Party for over a decade, she moved to Germany in 2003. She returned to Turkey in 2015, eventually becoming a Member of Parliament for the HDP in 2018.

== Political career ==
İmir was a member of the HADEP between 1994 and 2003. During this time, she was involved in supporting the youth and women. In 2003 she left Turkey and settled in Germany. She returned in 2015, when the opportunities for the Kurds became better. In the parliamentary elections of 2018 Imir was elected into the Grand National Assembly of Turkey representing the HDP for Sirnak.

=== Political positions ===
She is a human rights activist and has presented several parliamentary questions to Justice Minister Abdülhamit Gül. She demands better opportunities for the Kurdish-speaking youth in Turkey and blames the European Union for remaining too silent in regards to human rights violations in Turkey.

=== Prosecution ===
On the 17 March 2021, Bekir Şahin, the state prosecutor to the Turkish Court of Cassation filed a lawsuit before the Constitutional Court demanding for İmir and 686 other HDP politicians a five-year ban to participate in politics. The lawsuit was filed together with the request for a closure of the HDP due to the parties alleged organizational links with the PKK. In January 2022, a prosecutor demanded the lifting of her parliamentary immunity.

== Personal life ==
Besides a Turkish citizenship, she is also holds a German citizenship. Her mother lived in Germany. According to an interview she gave to the International Physicians for the Prevention of Nuclear War, her brother lost an arm while he fought the Islamic State in Syria.
