= Philippe-Jacques Abraham =

- Bishop of Gazarta
- See: Eparchy of Gazarta
- In office: 10 February 1882—August 28, 1915
- Predecessor: Joseph VI Audo
- Successor: Suppressed

Orders
- Ordination: 1873
- Consecration: 10 Feb 1882 by Joseph VI Audo

Personal details
- Born: January 3, 1848 Telkef, Mosul vilayet, Ottoman Empire
- Died: 28 August 1915 (aged 67) Cizre, Diyarbekir vilayet, Ottoman Empire

Philippe-Jacques Abraham (Syriac: ܐܒܪܗܡ ܦܝܠܝܦܘܣ ܝܥܩܘܒ, Orahim Pillipus Yaqub) (3 January 1848 – 28 August 1915) was an ethnic Assyrian bishop and martyr of the Chaldean Catholic Church.

== Early life and education ==
Abraham was born in Telkef, then part of the Ottoman Empire, on January 3, 1848. He joined the Rabban Hormizd Monastery at a young age, where he pursued his clerical studies and was consecrated as a bishop for the Syro-Malabar Church in British India by Patriarch Yawsep VI on 25 July 1875. Seven years later, he was consecrated as a bishop for the Chaldeans of the Jazira region.

Entrance gate of Rabban Hormizd Monastery, 1897

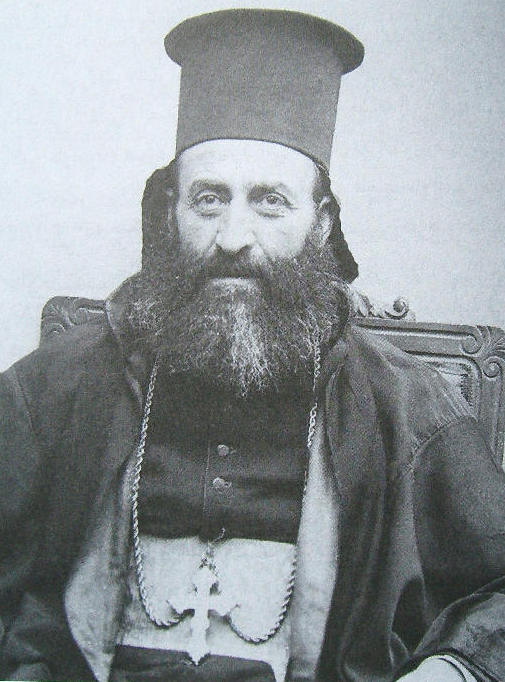
Abraham was executed alongside Flavianus Michael Malke (1856-1915), a Syriac Catholic bishop

== Martyrdom ==
During the Assyrian genocide, Abraham tried to ask for protection from the local Kurdish Agha to spare the city's Christians. His efforts were ultimately futile, and he was arrested by the Ottoman authorities on 21 August 1915. The authorities had him executed a week later alongside the Syriac Catholic bishop Flavianus Michael Malke and his body was dragged in the town's streets.

== See also ==
- Addai Scher
