= Ain Diwar Bridge =

Ruined Roman bridge in Syria

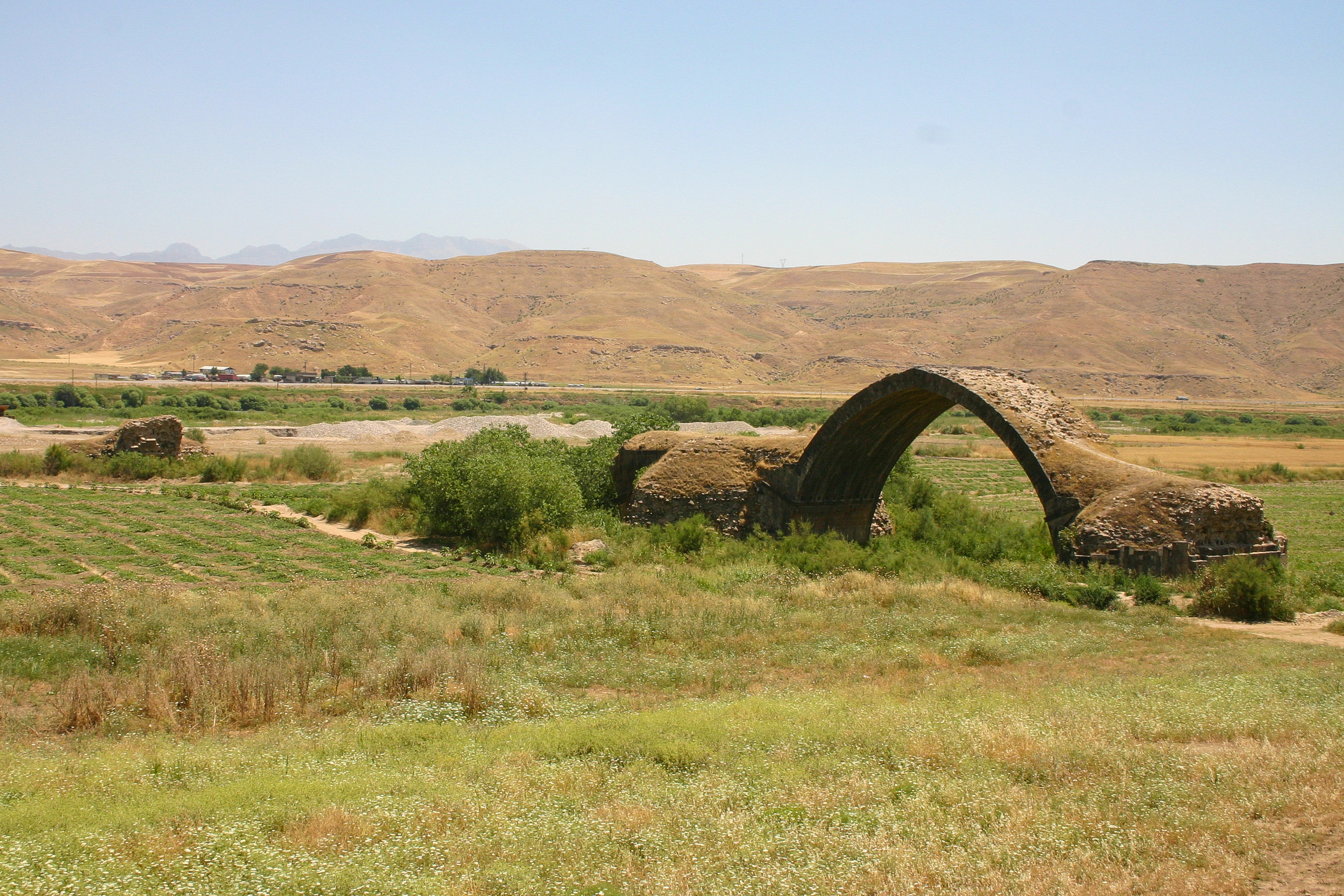
- The remaining span of the bridge at Ain Diwar; the Tigris flows in the distance
- Coordinates: 37°18′52″N 42°12′56″E
- Crosses: formerly crossed the Tigris River
- Locale: Close to Ain Diwar, Syria

Characteristics
- Design: Arch bridge
- Material: Stone
- No. of spans: 1 existing

Location
- Interactive map of Ain Diwar Bridge

The Ain Diwar Bridge, also known as the Zangid Bridge, is a ruined masonry arch bridge in Cizre, 3.5 km northeast of the town of Ain Diwar, Syria. The bridge is within vicinity of the Syria, Iraq and Turkey border region and about 500 m west of the Tigris River which it previously crossed.

According to some sources, the Ain Diwar bridge was built in the 2nd century by the Romans to give them access to Upper Mesopotamia. The Romans also previously set up the Bezabde Camp (modern day Cizre, Turkey) nearby. It was refurbished by the Seljuks and Arabs in the late 12th or early 13th century. The Ain Diwar Bridge is often referred to as a great example of Islamic architecture and civil engineering. Stone carvings on the bridge depict astrological figures, zodiac signs and cavalrymen, which are attributed to Zengid architecture.

The structure is listed neither by O'Connor nor Galliazzo in their comprehensive surveys of Roman bridges.

According to a recent (2014) reappraisal by David Nicolle, the bridge is entirely Zengid in origin, without any previous construction. It was built from 1146 to 1163 AD.

Contrary to information still found in some non-academic publications, the bridge which either spanned or was intended to span the river Tigris a few kilometers downstream from what is now the Turkish frontier town of Cizre is not a Roman construction. Nor is there real evidence that any pre-Islamic bridge was ever built at this location. Arabic historical sources make clear that the existing, largely ruined or perhaps never completed bridge dates from between 541 AH (1146/7 AD) and 559 AH (1163/4 AD) 1163 AD. It was constructed on the orders of, or sponsored by Ǧamāl al-Dīn Muḥammad al-Iṣfahānī Ibn ʿAlī Ibn Abī Manṣūr, the wazīr or chief minister of Quṭb al-Dīn Mawdūd Ibn Zangī, the Zangid ruler of Mosul.

— David Nicolle, The Zangid bridge of Ǧazīrat ibn ʿUmar.

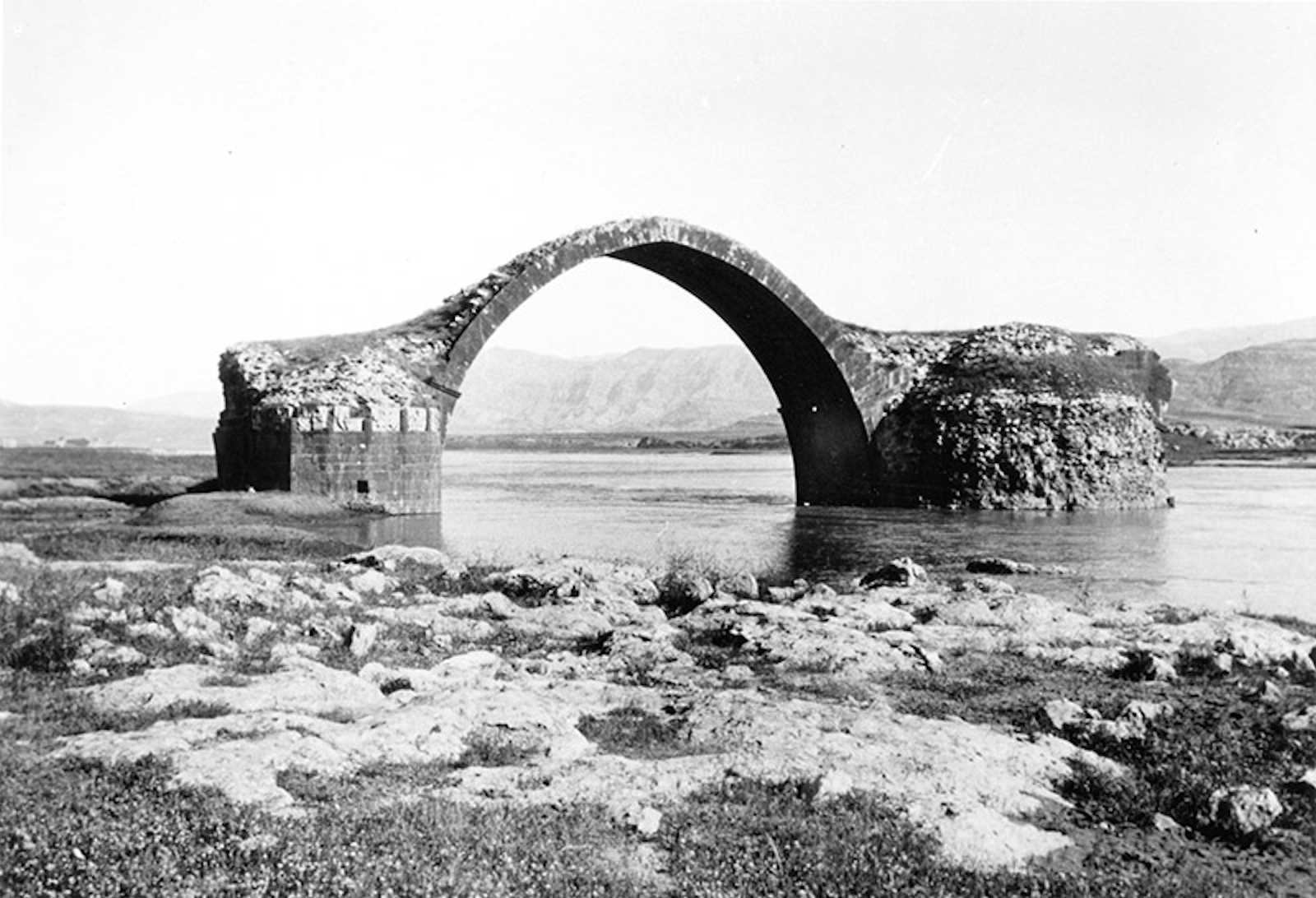
The bridge, pre-World-War I

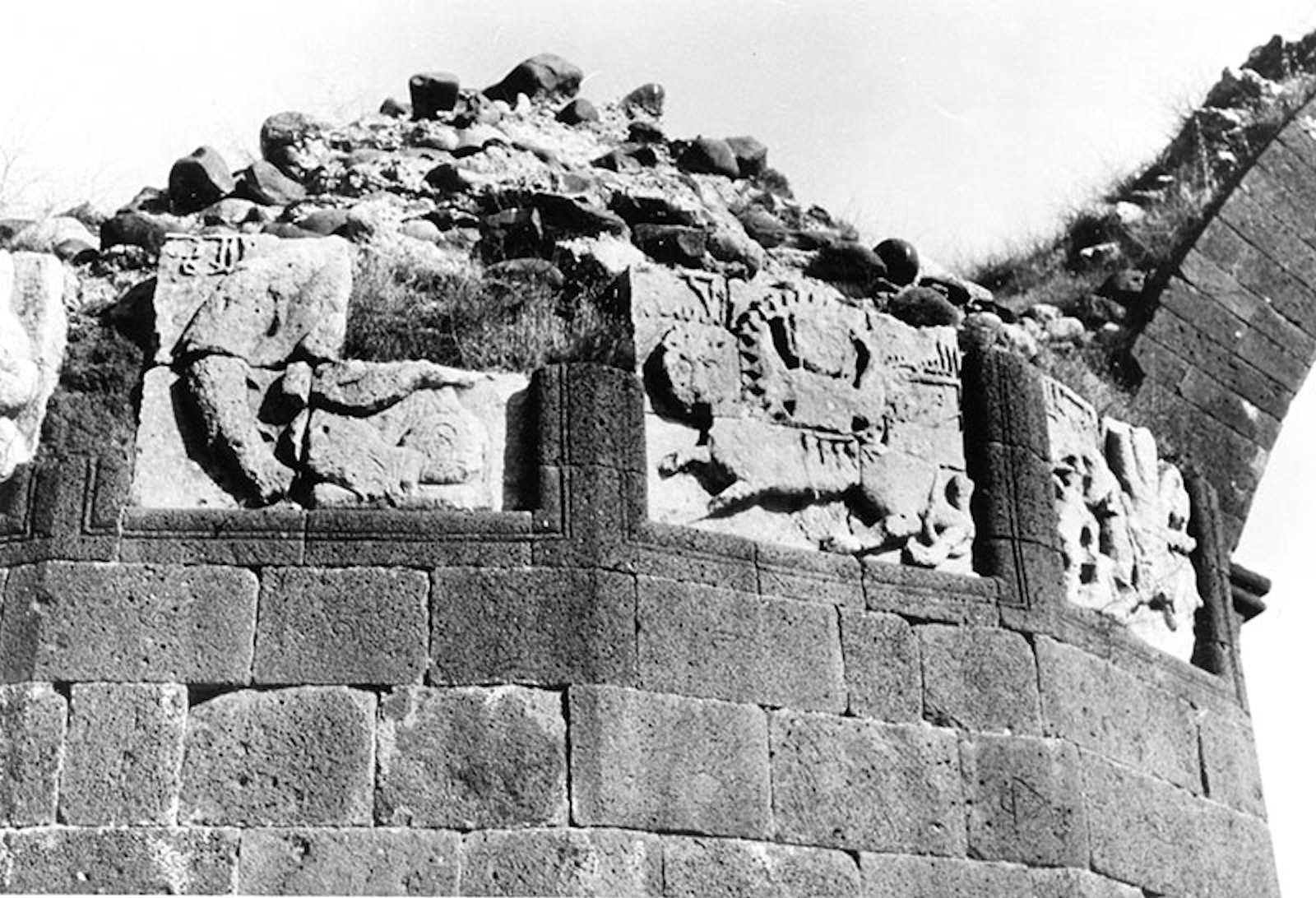
Reliefs of Zengid zodiacal signs

== See also ==
- List of Roman bridges
- Roman architecture
- Roman engineering
