= Cizre =

- Municipality
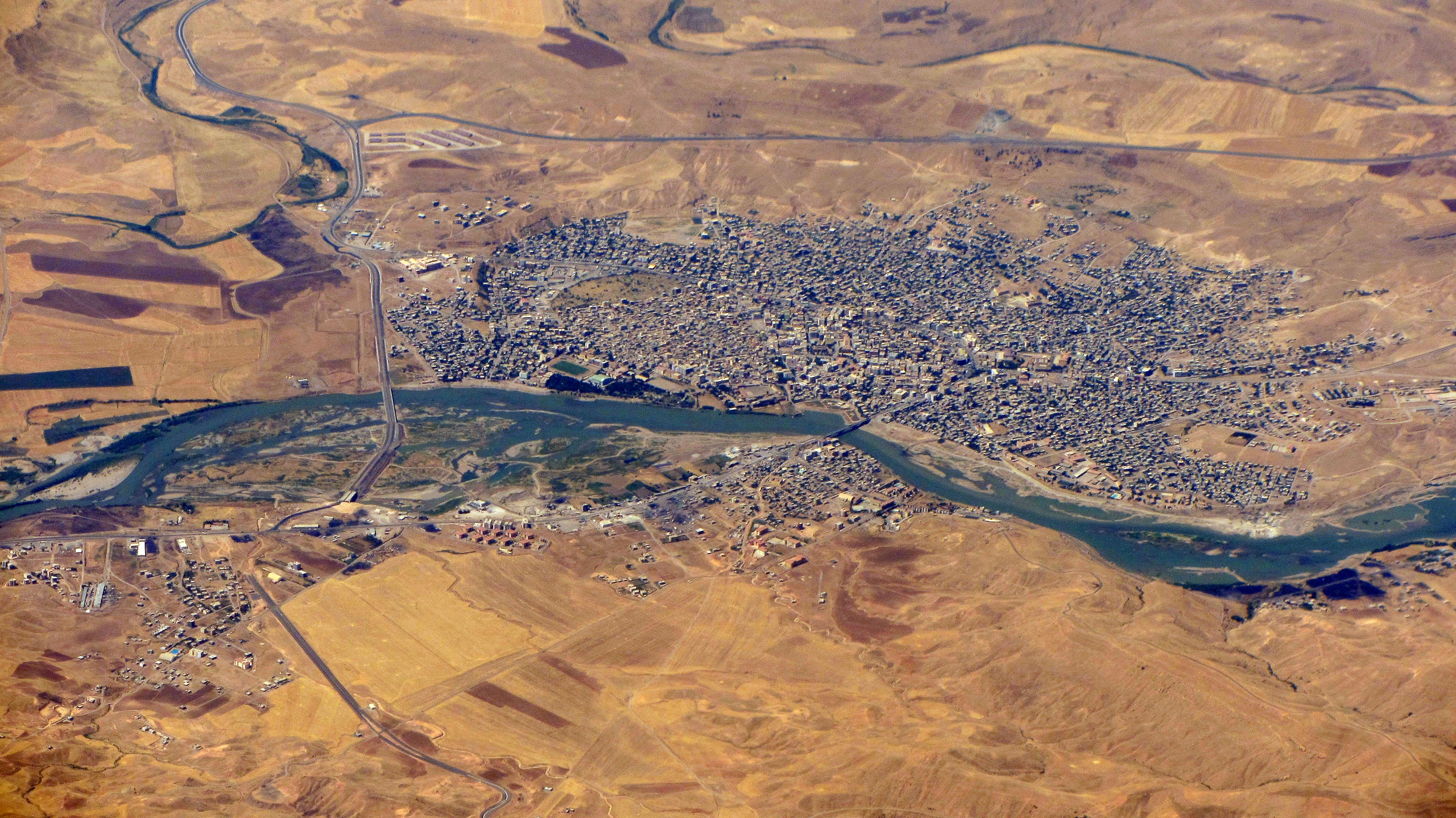
- Aerial view of Cizre

- Logo

- Location within Turkey
- Coordinates: 37.332°N 42.187°E
- Country: Turkey
- Province: Şırnak
- District: Cizre

Government
  - Acting Mayor: Davut Sinanoğlu
- Population (2021): 130,916
- Time zone: UTC+3 (TRT)
- Website: www.cizre.bel.tr

Cizre (Turkish: [ˈdʒizɾe]) (Note: Also known as Jizra prior to the modern Turkish scripting of "Cizre".: Arabic: جَزِيْرَة ٱبْن عُمَر, romanized: Jazīrat Ibn ʿUmar, alternatively transliterated as Jezirat al-Omar, Djeziret ibn-Omar, Jazīra, al-Jazirah, or Djezireh. Also known as Madinat al-Jazira.; Kurdish: Cizîr, Cizîra Botan, or Cizîre.; Lishana Deni: גזירא, romanized: Gzira.; Syriac: ܓܙܪܬܐ ܕܒܪ ܥܘܡܪ, romanized: Jazirat Ibn ʿUmar, alternatively known as Gāzartā, Gāzartā d'Beṯ Zabdaï, Gōzartō d-Qardū, Gozarto, Gzarta, or Gziro.) is a city in the Cizre District of Şırnak Province in Turkey. It is located on the river Tigris by the Syria–Turkey border and close to the Iraq–Turkey border. Cizre is in the historical region of Upper Mesopotamia and the cultural region of Turkish Kurdistan. The city had a population of 130,916 in 2021. It is predominantly inhabited by Kurds.

Cizre was founded as Jazirat Ibn ʿUmar in the 9th century by Al-Hasan ibn Umar, Emir of Mosul, on a manmade island in the Tigris. The city benefited from its situation as a river crossing and port in addition to its position at the end of an old Roman road which connected it to the Mediterranean Sea, and thus became an important commercial and strategic centre in Upper Mesopotamia. By the 12th century, it had adopted an intellectual and religious role, and sizeable Christian and Jewish communities are attested. Cizre suffered in the 15th century from multiple sackings and ultimately came under the control of the Ottoman Empire after 1515.

Under Ottoman control, Cizre stagnated and was left as a small district centre dominated by ruins by the end of the 19th century. The city's decline continued, exacerbated by the state-orchestrated destruction of its Christian population in the Armenian genocide and Sayfo in 1915, and exodus of its Jewish population to Israel in 1951. It began to recover in the second half of the 20th century through urban redevelopment, and its population saw a massive increase as a place of refuge from 1984 onwards as many fled the Kurdish–Turkish conflict. At the close of the 20th century and beginning of the 21st century, Cizre has emerged as a battleground between Kurdish militants and the Turkish state, which inflicted significant devastation on the city to retain control.

== Etymology ==
The various names for the city of Cizre descend from the original Arabic name Jazirat Ibn ʿUmar, which is derived from 'jazira' (island), "ibn" (son of), and the name Umar, thus Jazirat Ibn ʿUmar translates to 'island of the son of Umar'. The city's alternative Arabic name Madinat al-Jazira is composed of "madinat" ('city') and 'al-Jazira' (the island), and therefore translates to 'the island city'. Cizre was known in Syriac as Gāzartā d'Beṯ Zabdaï (island of Zabdicene), from 'gazarta' (island) and 'Beṯ Zabdaï' (Zabdicene).

== History ==
Historical affiliations

Hamdanid ???–978
Buyid 978–984
Marwanid 984–990
Uqaylid 990–???
Under Buyid suzerainty 990–996
Marwanid ???–1096
Under Seljuk suzerainty 1056–1096
Seljuk 1096–1127
Zengid 1127–1251
Under Seljuk suzerainty 1127–1183
Under Ayyubid suzerainty 1183–1251
Luluid 1251–1261
Under Mongol suzerainty 1252–1261
Ilkhanate 1262–1335
Bohtan 1336/1337–1456
Aq Qoyunlu 1456–1495/1496
Bohtan 1496–1847
Under Safavid suzerainty 1507–1515
Under Ottoman suzerainty 1515–1847
Ottoman Empire 1847–1923
Turkey 1923–present

=== Classical and early medieval period ===
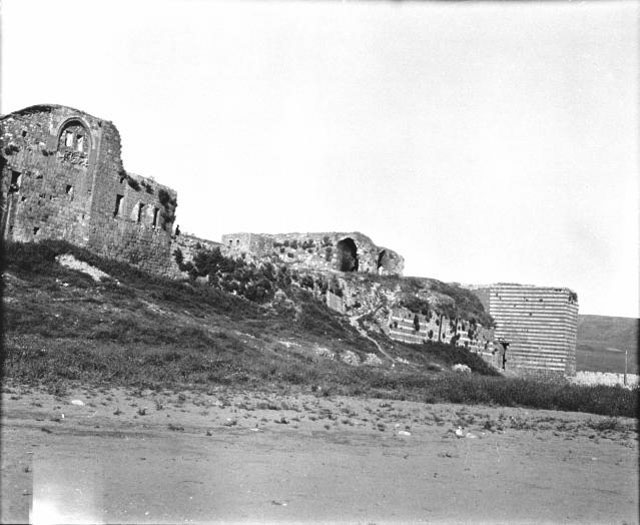
A photo of the citadel of Cizre taken by Gertrude Bell in 1908

Cizre is identified as the location of Ad flumen Tigrim, a river crossing depicted on the Tabula Peutingeriana, a Roman 4th/5th century map. The river crossing lay at the end of a Roman road that connected it with Nisibis, and was part of the region of Zabdicene. It was previously assumed by most scholars that Bezabde was located at the same site of what would later become Cizre, but is now agreed to be at Eski Hendek, 13 km (8.1 mi) northwest of Cizre.

Cizre was originally known as Jazirat Ibn ʿUmar, and was founded by and named after al-Hasan ibn Umar ibn al-Khattab al-Taghlibi (d. c. 865), Emir of Mosul, in the early 9th century, as recorded by Yaqut al-Hamawi in Mu'jam al-Buldan. The city was constructed in a bend in the river Tigris, and al-Hasan ibn Umar built a canal across the bend, placing the city on an island in the river, hence the city's name. Eventually, the original course of the river disappeared due to sedimentation and shifted to the canal, leaving the city on the west bank of the Tigris. Jazirat Ibn ʿUmar was situated to take advantage of trade routes from the direction of Amid to the northwest, Nisibin to the west, and Iran to the northeast. The city also functioned as a river port, and goods were transported by raft down the Tigris to Mosul and further south. Jazirat Ibn ʿUmar supplanted the neighbouring city of Bezabde as its inhabitants gradually left for the new city, and was likely abandoned in the early 10th century.

Medieval Islamic scholars recorded competing theories of the founder of the city as al-Harawi noted in Ziyarat that it was believed that Jazirat Ibn ʿUmar was the second city founded by Nuh (Noah) after the Great Flood. This belief rests on the identification of nearby Mount Judi as the apobaterion (place of descent) of Noah's Ark. The shahanshah Ardashir I of Iran (180–242) was also considered a potential founder. In Wafayāt al-Aʿyān, Ibn Khallikan reported that Yusuf ibn Umar al-Thaqafi (d. 744) was considered by some to be responsible for the city's foundation, whilst he argued that Abd al-Aziz ibn Umar was the founder and namesake of Jazirat Ibn ʿUmar.

The city was fortified in the 10th century at the latest. In the 10th century, Ibn Hawqal in Surat al-Ard described Jazirat Ibn ʿUmar as an entrepôt engaged in trade with the Byzantine Empire, Armenia, and the districts of Mayyafariqin, Arzen, and Mosul. Abu Taghlib, Hamdanid Emir of Mosul, allied himself with the Buyid Emir Izz al-Dawla Bakhtiyar of Iraq in his civil war against his cousin Emir 'Adud al-Dawla of Fars in 977 on the condition that Bakhtiyar hand over Abu Taghlib's younger brother Hamdan, who had conspired against him. Although Abu Taghlib had secured his reign by executing his rival brother Hamdan, the alliance quickly backfired following Adud al-Dawla's victory over Abu Taghlib and Bakhtiyar at Samarra in the spring of 978 as he then annexed Hamdanid territory in upper Mesopotamia, and thus Jazirat Ibn ʿUmar came under Buyid rule, forcing Abu Taghlib to go into exile.

Buyid control of Jazirat Ibn ʿUmar was cut short by the civil war that followed the death of Adud al-Dawla in 983 as it allowed the Kurdish chief Badh ibn Dustak to seize Buyid territory in upper Mesopotamia in the following year, and he was acknowledged as its ruler by the claimant Emir Samsam al-Dawla. Bādh attempted to conquer Mosul in 990, and the Hamdanid brothers Abu Abdallah Husayn and Abu Tahir Ibrahim were sent by the Buyid Emir Baha al-Dawla to repel the threat. The Uqaylid clan agreed to aid the brothers against Bādh in return for the cities of Jazirat Ibn ʿUmar, Balad, and Nisibin, and Bādh was subsequently defeated and killed. The leader of the Uqaylids, Abu'l-Dhawwad Muhammad ibn al-Musayyab, secured control of the cities, and acknowledged Emir Baha al-Dawla as his sovereign. On Muhammad's death in 996, his brother and successor as emir, al-Muqallad, asserted his independence, expelling the Buyid presence in the emirate, and thus ending Buyid suzerainty.

=== High medieval period ===
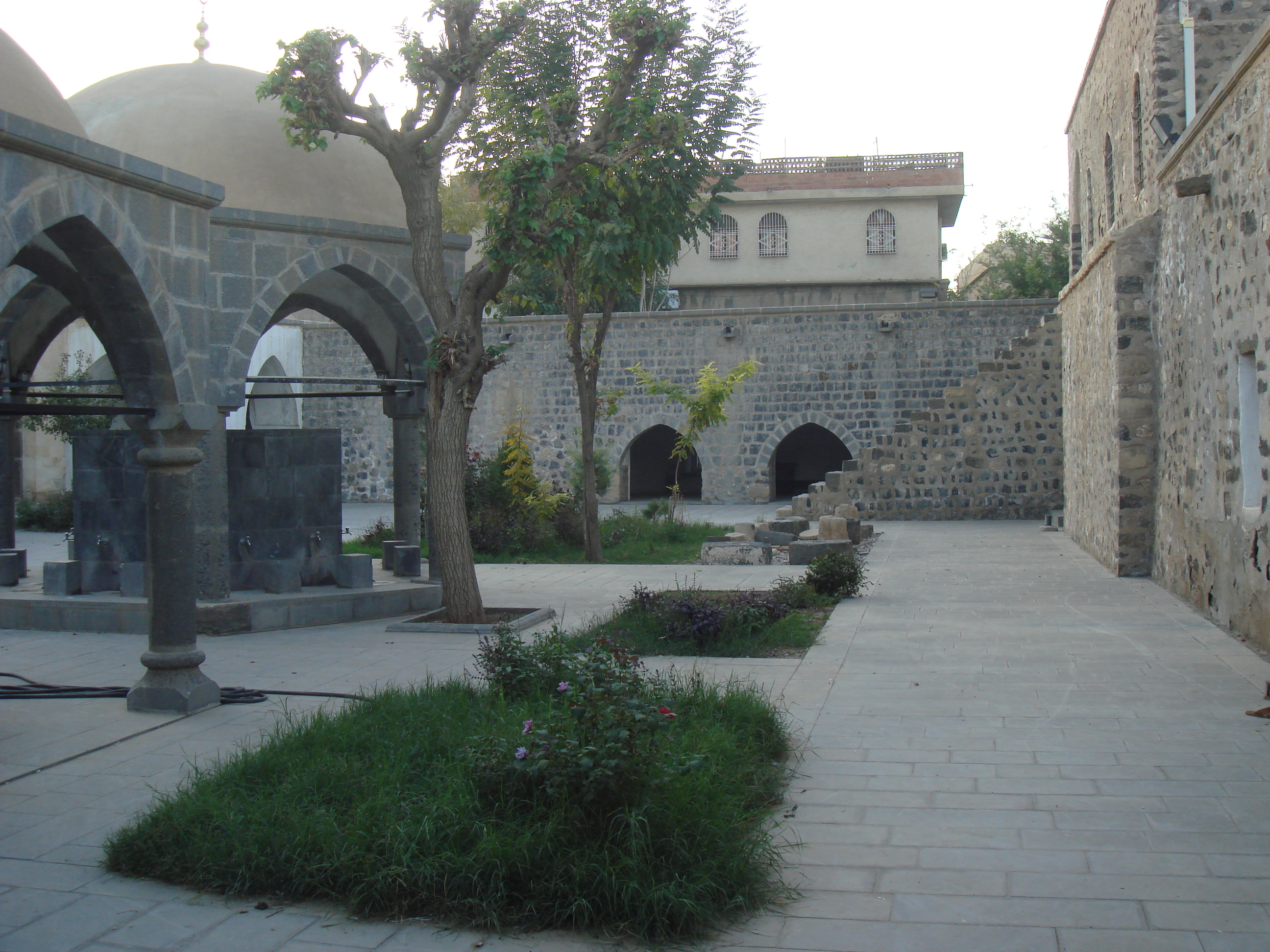
The Grand Mosque of Cizre

Turkmen nomads arrived in the vicinity of Jazirat Ibn ʿUmar in the summer of 1042, and carried out raids in Diyar Bakr and upper Mesopotamia. The Marwanid emirate became a vassal of the Seljuk Sultan Tughril in 1056.

In the summer of 1083, the former Marwanid vizier Fakhr al-Dawla ibn Jahir persuaded the Seljuk Sultan Malikshah to send him with an army against the Marwanid emirate, and eventually Jazirat Ibn ʿUmar, the last remaining Marwanid stronghold, was captured by the Seljuk Turks in 1085. Although the Marwanid emirate was severely reduced, its final emir, Nasir al-Dawla Mansur, was permitted to continue to rule solely Jazirat Ibn ʿUmar under the Seljuk Sultanate from 1085 onwards. The mamluk Jikirmish seized Mansur and usurped the emirate of Jazirat Ibn ʿUmar on Mansur's death in January 1096. In late 1096, Jikirmish set out to relieve Kerbogha's siege of Mosul following a request for aid from the Uqaylid emir Ali ibn Sharaf al-Dawla of Mosul, but was defeated by Kerbogha's brother Altuntash, and submitted to him as a vassal. Jikirmish was forced to aid in the ultimately successful siege against his former ally, and thus came under the suzerainty of Kerbogha as Emir of Mosul. Kerbogha died in 1102, and Sultan Barkiyaruq appointed Jikirmish as his replacement as emir. Jazirat Ibn ʿUmar was thereafter directly ruled over by a string of Seljuk emirs of Mosul until the appointment of Zengi.

Emir Aqsunqur al-Bursuqi of Mosul was murdered by Assassins in 1126, and was succeeded by his son Mas'ud. He died after several months, and his younger brother became emir with the mamluk Jawali serving as atabeg (regent). Jawali sent envoys to Sultan Mahmud II to receive official recognition for al-Bursuqi's son as emir of Mosul, but the envoys bribed the vizier Anu Shurwan to recommend Imad al-Din Zengi be appointed as emir of Mosul instead. The sultan appointed Zengi as emir in the autumn of 1127, but he had to secure the emirate by force as forces loyal to al-Bursuqi's son resisted Zengi, and retained control of Jazirat Ibn ʿUmar. After taking Mosul, Zengi marched north and besieged Jazirat Ibn ʿUmar; in an attack, he ferried soldiers across the river whilst others swam to the city, and eventually the city surrendered. Later, an Artuqid coalition of Da'ud of Hisn Kayfa, Timurtash of Mardin, and Ilaldi of Amid threatened Zengi's realm in 1130 whilst he campaigned in the vicinity of Aleppo in Syria, forcing him to return and defeat them at Dara. After the battle, Da'ud marched on Jazirat Ibn ʿUmar and pillaged its surroundings, thus Zengi advanced to counter him, and Da'ud withdrew to the mountains.

The dozdar (governor of the citadel) of Jazirat Ibn ʿUmar, Thiqat al-Din Hasan, was reported to have sexually harassed soldiers' wives whilst their husbands were on campaign, and thus Zengi sent his hajib (chamberlain) al-Yaghsiyani to handle the situation. To avoid a rebellion, al-Yaghsiyani told Hasan he was promoted to dozdar of Aleppo, so he arranged to leave the city, but was arrested, castrated, and crucified by al-Yaghsiyani upon leaving the citadel. The Jewish scholar Abraham ibn Ezra visited the city in November 1142. On Zengi's death in 1146, his eldest son Sayf al-Din Ghazi I received the emirate of Mosul, including Jazirat Ibn ʿUmar, and Izz al-Dīn Abū Bakr al-Dubaysī was appointed as the city's governor. The city was transferred to Qutb al-Din Mawdud on his seizure of the emirate of Mosul after his elder brother Sayf al-Din's death in November 1149.

The Grand Mosque of Jazirat Ibn ʿUmar was constructed in 1155. After Qutb al-Din's death in September 1170, Jazirat Ibn ʿUmar was inherited by his son and successor Sayf al-Din Ghazi II as emir of Mosul. Michael the Syrian recorded that a Syriac Orthodox monastery was confiscated and the city's bishop Basilius was imprisoned in 1173. Upon the death of Sayf al-Din Ghazi in 1180, Jazirat Ibn ʿUmar was granted as an iqta' to his son Mu'izz al-Din Sanjar Shah within the emirate of Mosul, however, in late 1183, Sanjar Shah recognised Saladin as his suzerain, thus becoming a vassal of the Ayyubid Sultanate of Egypt, and effectively forming an autonomous principality. Sanjar Shah continued to mint coins in his own name, and copper dirhams were minted at Jazirat Ibn ʿUmar in 1203/1204.

Sanjar Shah ruled until his murder by his son Ghazi in 1208, and was succeeded by his son Mu'izz al-Din Mahmud. Mahmud successfully maintained Zengid control over Jazirat Ibn ʿUmar with the marriage of his son Al-Malik al-Mas'ud Shahanshah to the daughter of Badr al-Din Lu'lu', who had overthrown the Zengids at Mosul, and usurped power for himself in 1233. The Grand Mosque of Jazirat Ibn ʿUmar was renovated during Mahmud's reign. In the early 13th century, the city's fort and madrasa are attested by Ibn al-Athir in Al-Tārīkh al-bāhir fī al-Dawlah al-Atābakīyah bi-al-Mawṣil, and its mosque by Ibn Khallikan in Wafayāt al-Aʿyān. According to the Arab scholar Izz al-Din ibn Shaddad, the Mongol Empire demanded 100,000 dinars in tribute from the ruler of Jazirat Ibn ʿUmar in 1251. The end of the Zengid dynasty was heralded by the death of Mahmud in 1251, as Badr al-Din Lu'lu' had Mahmud's successor Al-Malik al-Mas'ud Shahanshah killed soon after, and assumed control of Jazirat Ibn ʿUmar.

=== Late medieval period ===
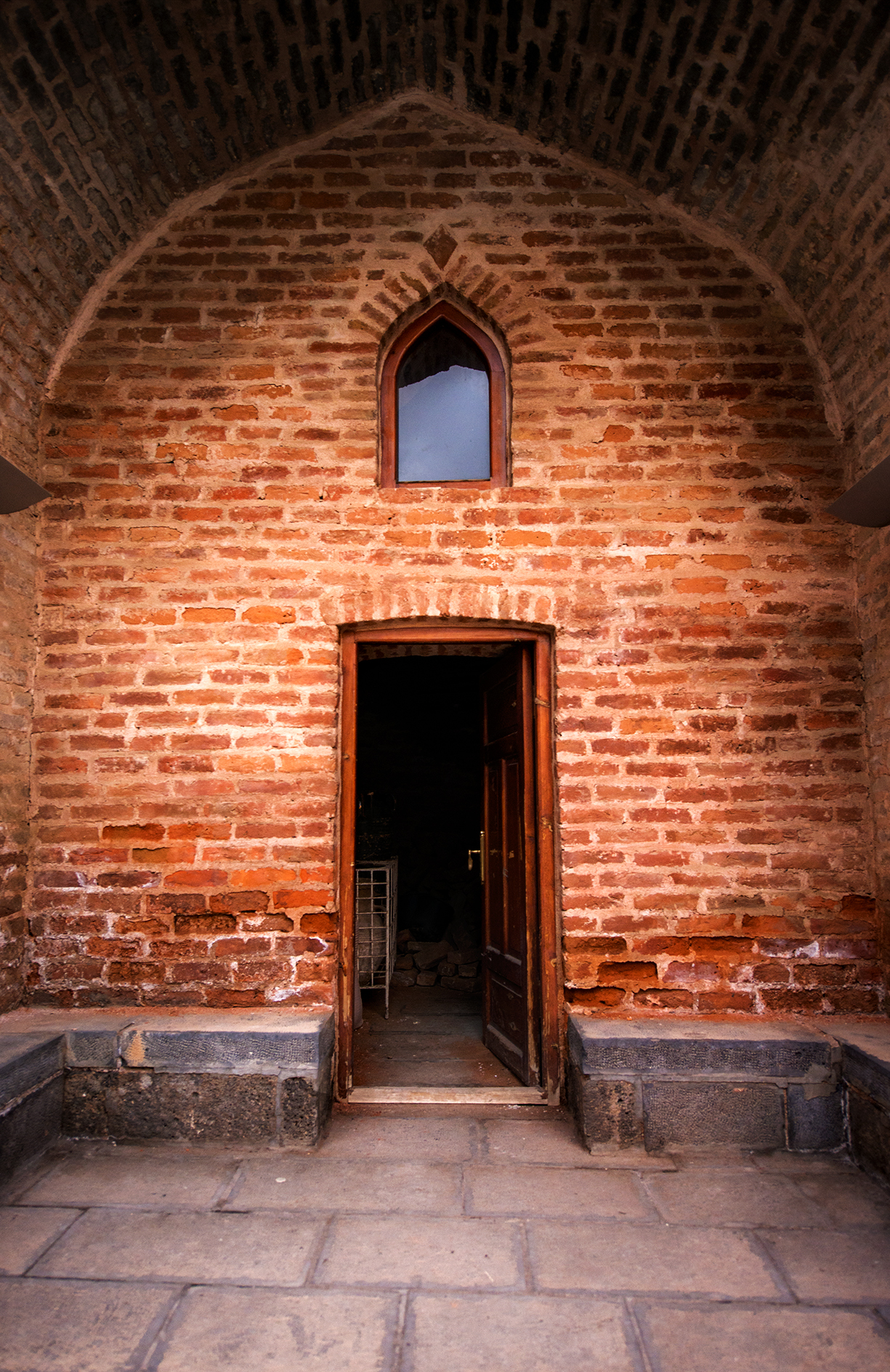
The Red Madrasa of Cizre

Badr al-Din Lu'lu' acknowledged Mongol suzerainty to secure his realm as early as 1252, and minted coins in the name of Great Khan Möngke Khan in 1255 at the latest. He is also known to have had a mosque built at Jazirat Ibn ʿUmar. Badr al-Din became subject to the Mongol Ilkhanate on Hulagu Khan's assumption of the title Ilkhan (subject khan) in 1256. Badr al-Din Lu'lu' died in July/August 1259, and his realm was divided between his sons, and Jazirat Ibn ʿUmar was bequeathed to his son al-Malik Al-Mujahid Sayf al-Din Ishaq. The sons of Badr al-Din Lu'lu' chafed under Mongol rule and soon all had rebelled and travelled to Egypt seeking military assistance as al-Muzaffar Ala al-Din Ali left Sinjar in 1260, al-Salih Rukn al-Din Ismail left Mosul in June 1261, and finally Ishaq fled Jazirat Ibn ʿUmar for Mamluk Egypt shortly afterwards. Prior to his flight, Ishaq extorted 700 dinars from the city's Christians, and news of his impending escape pushed the populace to riot against his decision to leave the city to the wrath of the Mongols.

In Ishaq's absence, 'Izz ad-Din 'Aibag, Emir of Amadiya, seized the city, and an attack by Abd Allah, Emir of Mayyafariqin, was repelled. Baibars, Sultan of Egypt, refused to provide an army to the sons of Badr al-Din against the Mongols, but they were permitted to accompany Caliph Al-Mustansir on his campaign to reconquer Baghdad from the Mongols. The three brothers marched with the caliph's campaign until they split at Al-Rahba, and travelled to Sinjar, where Ali and Ishaq briefly remained whilst Ismail continued onwards to Mosul. However, the two brothers abandoned Sinjar and Jazirat Ibn ʿUmar to the Mongols, and returned to Egypt upon learning of the caliph's death and defeat in November. Mosul was sacked and Ismail was killed by a Mongol army, after the Siege of Mosul (1261) from November to July/August 1262. After the sack of Mosul, the Mongol army led by Samdaghu besieged Jazirat Ibn ʿUmar until the summer of 1263; the siege was lifted and the city spared when the Church of the East bishop Henan Isho claimed to have knowledge of chrysopoeia, and offered to render his services. Jemal ad-Din Gulbag was appointed to govern Jazirat Ibn ʿUmar, but he was later executed for conspiring with the city's former ruler Ishaq, and was replaced by Henan Isho, who was also executed in 1268, following accusations of impropriety.

In the second half of the 13th century, Mongol gold, silver, and copper coins were minted at Jazirat Ibn ʿUmar, and production there increased after Khan Ghazan's (r. 1295–1304) reforms. It was later attested that the vizier Rashid-al-Din Hamadani had planned to construct a canal from the Tigris by the city. Jazirat Ibn ʿUmar was visited by the Moroccan scholar Ibn Battuta in 1327, and he noted the city's mosque, bazaar, and three gates. In 1326/1327, the city was granted as a fief to a Turkman chief, and Jazirat Ibn ʿUmar remained under his control until the disintegration of the Ilkhanate in 1335, soon after which it was seized by the Bohtan clan in 1336/1337 with the aid of al-Ashraf, Ayyubid Emir of Hisn Kayfa. In the 1330s, Hamdallah Mustawfi in Nuzhat Al Qulub reported that Jazirat Ibn ʿUmar had an annual revenue of 170,200 dinars. The emirate of Hisn Kayfa had aimed to control Jazirat Ibn ʿUmar through the Bohtan clan in providing military assistance to its capture and the marriage of a daughter to Izz ad-Din, Emir of Bohtan, but this was unsuccessful as the Bohtan emirate developed the city and consolidated their rule, and eventually the emir of Hisn Kayfa attempted to take Jazirat Ibn ʿUmar by force in 1384/1385, but was repelled.

The emirate of Bohtan submitted to the Timurid Empire in 1400, after Timur sacked Jazirat Ibn ʿUmar in retribution for the emir having seized one of his baggage convoys. As punishment for the emir's refusal to participate in Timur's campaign in Iraq, the city was sacked by Timur's son Miran Shah.

=== Early modern period ===
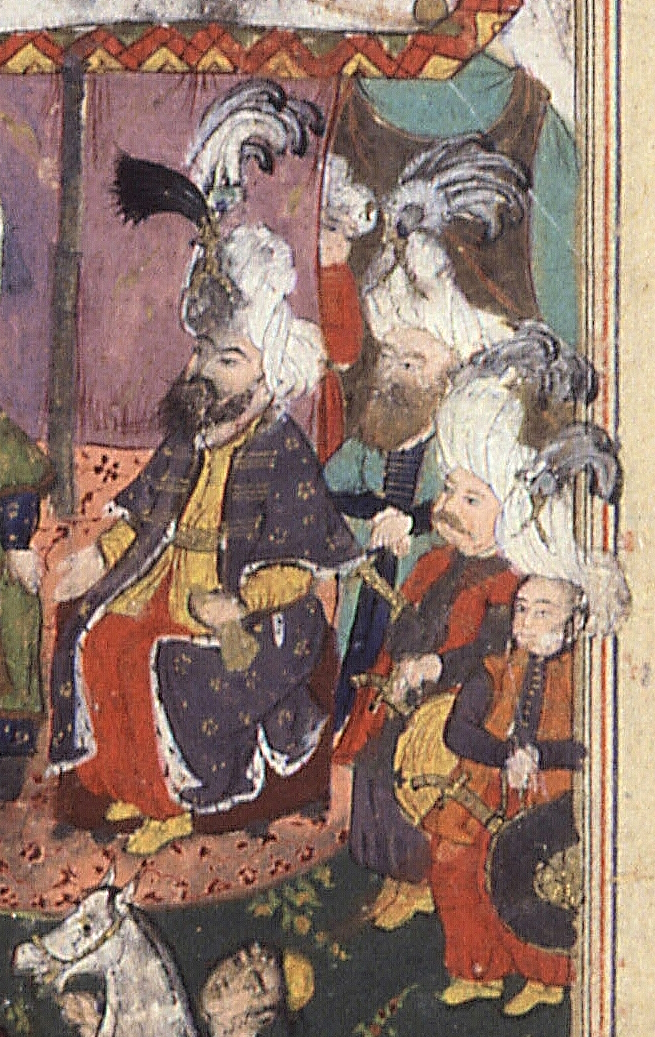
Eyewitness depiction of Kurdish prince Mir Sheref and his retinue in Jizra in 1602-03 (BNF, Turc 127).

Uzun Hasan usurped leadership of the Aq Qoyunlu from his elder brother Jahangir in a coup at Amid in 1452, and set about expanding his realm by seizing Jazirat Ibn ʿUmar in 1456, whilst the emir of Bohtan withdrew into the mountains. Rebellion and civil war followed the death of Uzun Hasan in 1478, and the emir of Bohtan retook Jazirat Ibn ʿUmar from the Aq Qoyunlu in 1495/1496.

Jazirat Ibn ʿUmar came under Safavid suzerainty in the first decade of the 16th century, but after the Ottoman victory at the battle of Chaldiran over Shah Ismail I in 1514, Sultan Selim I sent Idris Bitlisi to the city and he successfully convinced the emir of Bohtan to submit to the Ottoman Empire. The emirate of Bohtan was incorporated into the empire as a hükûmet (autonomous territory), and was assigned to the eyalet (province) of Diyarbekir upon its formation in 1515. Sayyid Ahmad ruled in 1535.

Christian families from Erbil found refuge and settled in Jazirat Ibn ʿUmar in 1566. In the mid-17th century, Evliya Çelebi visited Jazirat Ibn ʿUmar en route from Mosul to Hisn Kayfa, and noted the city possessed four muftis and a naqib al-ashraf, and its qadis (judges) received a daily salary of 300 akçes. In the late 17th century, Jazirat Ibn ʿUmar is mentioned by Jean-Baptiste Tavernier in Les Six Voyages de J. B. Tavernier as a location on the route to Tabriz.

=== Late modern period ===
The Egyptian invasion of Syria in 1831-1832 allowed Muhammad Pasha of Rawanduz, Emir of Soran, to expand his realm, and he seized Jazirat Ibn ʿUmar in 1833. The Ottoman response to Muhammad Pasha was delayed by the war with Egypt until 1836, in which year Jazirat Ibn ʿUmar was retaken by an Ottoman army led by Reşid Mehmed Pasha. Reşid deposed Sayf al-Din Shir, Emir of Bohtan and mütesellim of Jazirat Ibn ʿUmar, and he was replaced by Bedir Khan Beg. In 1838, an Ottoman army was sent to Jazirat Ibn ʿUmar during the campaign to suppress the rebellion of Abdul Agha and Khan Mahmud in the vicinity of Lake Van. The German adviser Helmuth von Moltke the Elder accompanied the Ottoman army and reported back to the Ottoman government from Jazirat Ibn ʿUmar in June 1838. Bedir Khan Beg reportedly established a munitions and arms factory in the city.

In 1842, as part of the centralisation policies of the Tanzimat reforms, the kaza (district) of Jazirat Ibn ʿUmar was attached to the eyalet of Mosul, whilst the kaza of Bohtan, which constituted the remainder of the emirate, remained within the eyalet of Diyarbekir, thus administratively dividing the emirate, and provoking Bedir Khan. The administrative reform aimed to increase Ottoman state revenue, but left the previously loyal emir disgruntled with the Ottoman state. Jazirat Ibn ʿUmar was visited by the American missionary Asahel Grant on 13 June 1843. Bedir Khan's 1843 and 1846 massacres in Hakkari led the British and French governments to demand his removal from power, and he was subsequently summoned to Constantinople, but Bedir Khan refused, and an Ottoman army was sent against him. The emir defeated the Ottoman army, and he declared the independence of the Emirate of Bohtan. Bedir Khan's success was brief as a large Ottoman army led by Osman Pasha, with Omar Pasha and Sabri Pasha, marched against him, and his relative Yezdanşêr defected and allowed for the Ottoman occupation of Jazirat Ibn ʿUmar. The Ottoman government unsuccessfully encouraged Bedir Khan to surrender, and the vali (governor) of Diyarbekir wrote to the Naqshbandi sheikhs İbrahim, Salih, and Azrail at Jazirat Ibn ʿUmar to mediate in June 1847. Although Bedir Khan retook Jazirat Ibn ʿUmar, the emir was forced to withdraw and surrendered on 29 July.

As a consequence of Bedir Khan's rebellion, the emirate of Bohtan was dissolved and Yezdanşêr succeeded him as mütesellim of Jazirat Ibn ʿUmar. Also, the eyalet of Kurdistan was formed on 5 December 1847, and included the kazas of Jazirat Ibn ʿUmar and Bohtan. Yezdanşêr met with Lieutenant Colonel (later General) Fenwick Williams at Jazirat Ibn ʿUmar in 1849 whilst he participated as the British representative in a commission to settle the Ottoman-Iranian border. Yezdanşêr was soon replaced by the kaymakam Mustafa Pasha, sent away to Constantinople in March 1849, and forbidden from returning to Jazirat Ibn ʿUmar. In 1852, the iane-i umumiye (temporary tax) was introduced, and the kaza of Jazirat Ibn ʿUmar was expected to provide 23,140 piastres. During the Crimean War, in 1854, Yezdanşêr was ordered to recruit soldiers for the war, and 900 Kurds were recruited from Jazirat Ibn ʿUmar and Bohtan. Yezdanşêr claimed to be maltreated by local officials and revolted in November, with Jazirat Ibn ʿUmar under his control. He offered to surrender in January 1855 on the condition that he received the kazas of Jazirat Ibn ʿUmar and Bohtan, but this was rejected. An Ottoman army consisting of a regiment of infantry, a regiment of cavalry, and a battery of six guns was ordered to march on Jazirat Ibn ʿUmar in February. In March, Yezdanşêr accepted terms offered by General Williams, the British military commissioner with the Ottoman Anatolian army, and surrendered.

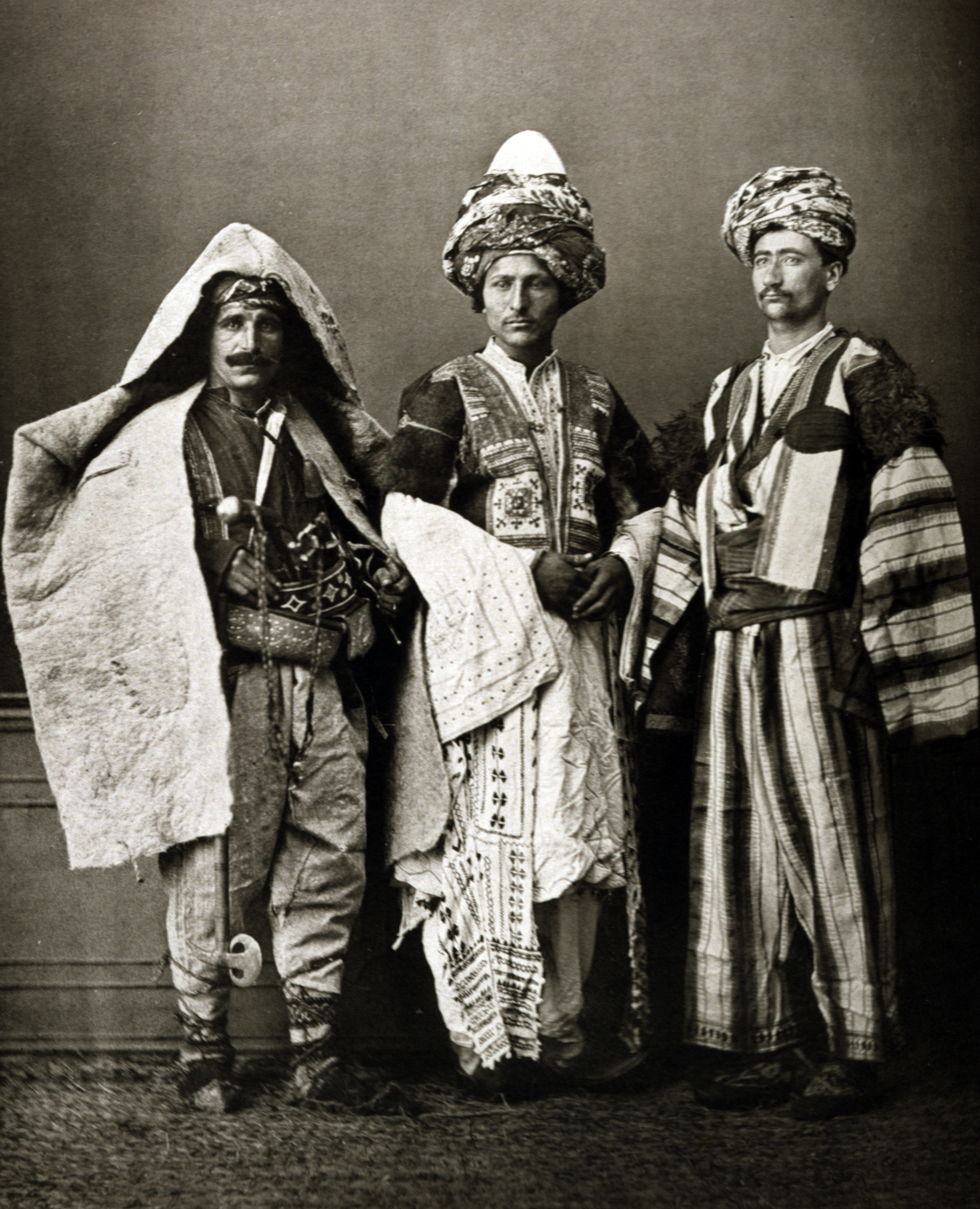
A photo of Kurds taken by Pascal Sébah in 1873. The man on the right was from Cizre.

In 1867, the eyalet of Kurdistan was dissolved and replaced by the Diyarbekir Vilayet, and Jazirat Ibn ʿUmar became the seat of a kaza in the sanjak of Mardin. The kaza was subdivided into nine nahiyes, and possessed 210 villages. Osman, son of Bedir Khan, seized Jazirat Ibn ʿUmar in 1878 after his escape from captivity at Constantinople using demobilised Kurdish veterans of the Russo-Turkish War of 1877–78, and proclaimed himself as emir. The rebellion endured for eight months until it was quelled by an Ottoman army led by Shevket Bey. The city was visited by the German scholar Eduard Sachau in 1880. In the late 19th century, the French geographer Vital Cuinet recorded in La Turquie d'Asie the city's five caravanserais, one-hundred and six shops, ten cafés, and a vaulted bazaar. At the inception of the Hamidiye cavalry corps in 1891, Mustafa, agha (chief) of the local Miran clan, enrolled and was made a commander with the rank of paşa, hereafter known as Mustafa Paşa. Throughout the 1890s, Mustafa Paşa exploited his position to seize goods from merchants and plunder Christian villages in the district. In 1892, Mustafa Paşa converted a mosque at Jazirat Ibn ʿUmar into a barracks for his soldiers.

The appointment of Mehmed Enis Paşa as vali of Diyarbekir on 4 October 1895 was quickly followed by massacres of Christians throughout the province, and in mid-November an Ottoman army repelled an attempt by Mustafa Paşa to enter the city and slaughter its Christian inhabitants. Mustafa Paşa subsequently complained to Enis Paşa, and the officer in charge of the regiment was summoned to Diyarbekir. Later, the British and French vice-consuls at Diyarbekir, Cecil Marsham Hallward and Gustave Meyrier, respectively, suspected that Enis Paşa was responsible for the massacres in the province. In 1897, the British diplomat Telford Waugh reported that Jazirat Ibn ʿUmar was used as a place of exile by the Ottoman Empire as he noted the presence of Albanians deported there, and that the city's governor Faris, agha of the Şammar clan, had been exiled there after his fall from grace.

=== Early 20th century ===
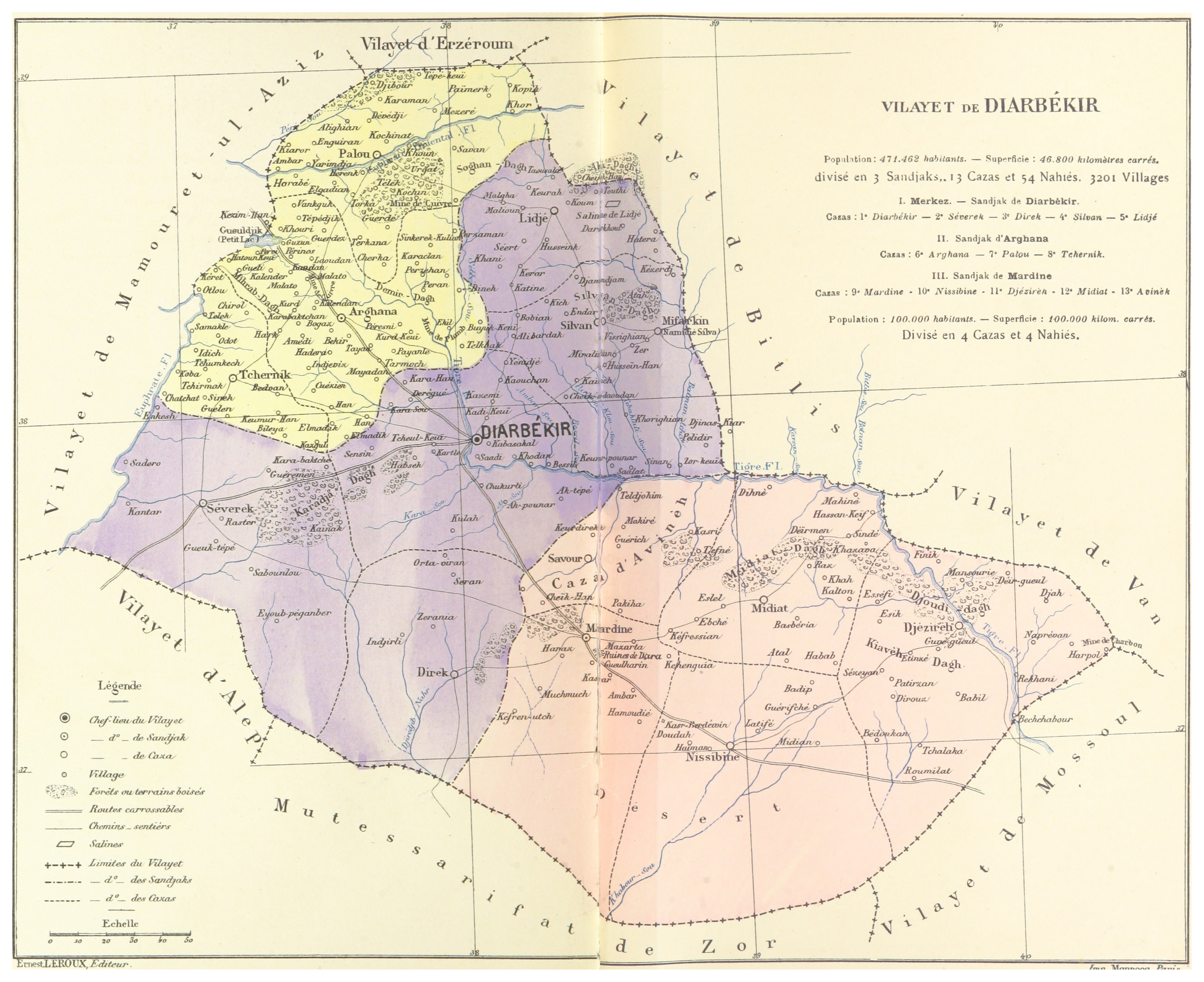
The district of Djezireh (Cizre) in the province of Diyarbekir prior to the partition of the Ottoman Empire

Mustafa Paşa feuded with agha Muhammad Aghayê Sor, and in 1900 the kaymakam of Jazirat Ibn ʿUmar intervened to aid the Tayan clan, Mustafa Paşa's allies, against Aghayê Sor. Several months later, Mustafa Paşa had twenty villages in the district loyal to his rival destroyed, and Aghayê Sor wrote to the Brigadier General Bahaeddin Paşa seeking protection. Bahaeddin Paşa travelled to Jazirat Ibn ʿUmar to conduct an inquiry, but was imprisoned there for five days by Mustafa Paşa, and the two rivals continued to attack each other's territories until Mustafa Paşa was assassinated on Aghayê Sor's orders in 1902. Within the kaza of Jazirat Ibn ʿUmar, in 1909, there were 1500 households, 1000 of which possessed over 50 dönüms. As late as 1910, the Miran clan annually migrated from their winter pastures in the plain of Mosul to Jazirat Ibn ʿUmar in the spring to trade and pay taxes, and then across the Tigris to summer grazing grounds at the source of the River Botan. The British scholar Gertrude Bell visited the city in May 1910.

In 1915, amidst the ongoing genocide of Armenians and Assyrians perpetrated by the Ottoman government and local Kurds, Aziz Feyzi and Zülfü Bey carried out preparations to destroy the Christian population of Jazirat Ibn ʿUmar on orders from Mehmed Reshid, vali of Diyarbekir. From 29 April to 12 May, the officials toured the district and incited the Kurds against the Christians; Halil Sâmi, kaymakam of Jazirat Ibn ʿUmar since 31 March 1913, was replaced by Kemal Bey on 2 May 1915 due to his refusal to support the plans for genocide. At this time, two redif (reserve) battalions were stationed in the city. Julius Behnam, Syriac Orthodox Archbishop of Gazarta, fled to Azakh upon hearing of the commencement of massacres in the province in July. Christians in rural areas of the district were massacred over several days from 8 August onwards, and several Jacobite and 15 Chaldean Catholic villages were destroyed.

On the night of 28 August, Flavianus Michael Malke, Syriac Catholic Bishop of Gazarta, and Philippe-Jacques Abraham, Chaldean Catholic Bishop of Gazarta, were killed. On 29 August, Aziz Feyzi, Ahmed Hilmi, Mufti of Jazirat Ibn ʿUmar, and Ömer, agha of the Reman clan, coordinated the arrest, torture, and execution of all Armenian men and a number of Assyrians in Jazirat Ibn ʿUmar. The men's bodies were dumped in the Tigris, and, two days later, the children were abducted into Muslim households, and most women were raped and killed, and their bodies were also thrown into the river. Walter Holstein, German vice-consul at Mosul, reported the massacre to the German embassy at Constantinople on 9 September, and the German ambassador Ernst II, Prince of Hohenlohe-Langenburg informed the German Foreign Office on 11 September that the massacre had resulted in the death of 4750 Armenians (2500 Gregorians, 1250 Catholics, and 1000 Protestants) and 350 Assyrians (250 Chaldeans and 100 Jacobites). After the massacre, eleven churches and three chapels were confiscated. 200 Armenians from Erzurum were exterminated near Jazirat Ibn ʿUmar by General Halil Kut on 22 September. Kemal Bey continued in the office of kaymakam until 3 November 1915.

In the aftermath of Ottoman defeat in the First World War, Ali İhsan Sâbis, commander of the Ottoman Sixth Army, was reported to have recruited and armed Kurds at Jazirat Ibn ʿUmar in February 1919 in an effort to prevent British occupation. After the murder of Captain Alfred Christopher Pearson, assistant political officer at Zakho, by Kurds on 4 April 1919, the occupation of Jazirat Ibn ʿUmar was considered to ensure the security of British Iraq, but ultimately dismissed. Ahmed Hilmi, Mufti of Jazirat Ibn ʿUmar, was ordered to be arrested in May 1919 for his role in the massacre in 1915 as part of the Turkish courts-martial of 1919–1920, but he evaded arrest as he was under the protection of local Kurdish clans.

Appeals from Kurds to the British government to create an independent Kurdish state spurred the appointment of Nihat Anılmış as commander at Cizre in June 1920 with instructions from the Prime Minister of Turkey Mustafa Kemal to establish local government and secure control of local Kurds by inciting them to engage in armed clashes against British and French forces, thus preventing good relations. Local Kurdish notables complained to the Grand National Assembly of Turkey of alleged illegal activity by Nihat Anılmış, and although it was decided no action was to be taken in July 1922, he was transferred away from Cizre in early September.

Amidst the partition of the Ottoman Empire, Cizre was allocated to become part of 'the specifically French zone of interests' as per the Treaty of Sèvres of 10 August 1920. However, Turkey concentrated a significant number of forces at Cizre in January 1923 to bolster the Turkish position at the Lausanne Conference of 1922–23, and the city itself was retained by Turkey, but part of the district was transferred to Syria and Iraq. In response to Kurdish revolts in the 1920s, the Turkish government aimed to Turkify the population of eastern Turkey, but Christians were deemed unsuitable, and thus attempted to eradicate those who had survived the genocide. In this effort, 257 Syriac Orthodox men from Azakh and neighbouring villages were imprisoned by the government at Cizre in 1926, where they were beaten and denied food.

=== Late 20th century ===
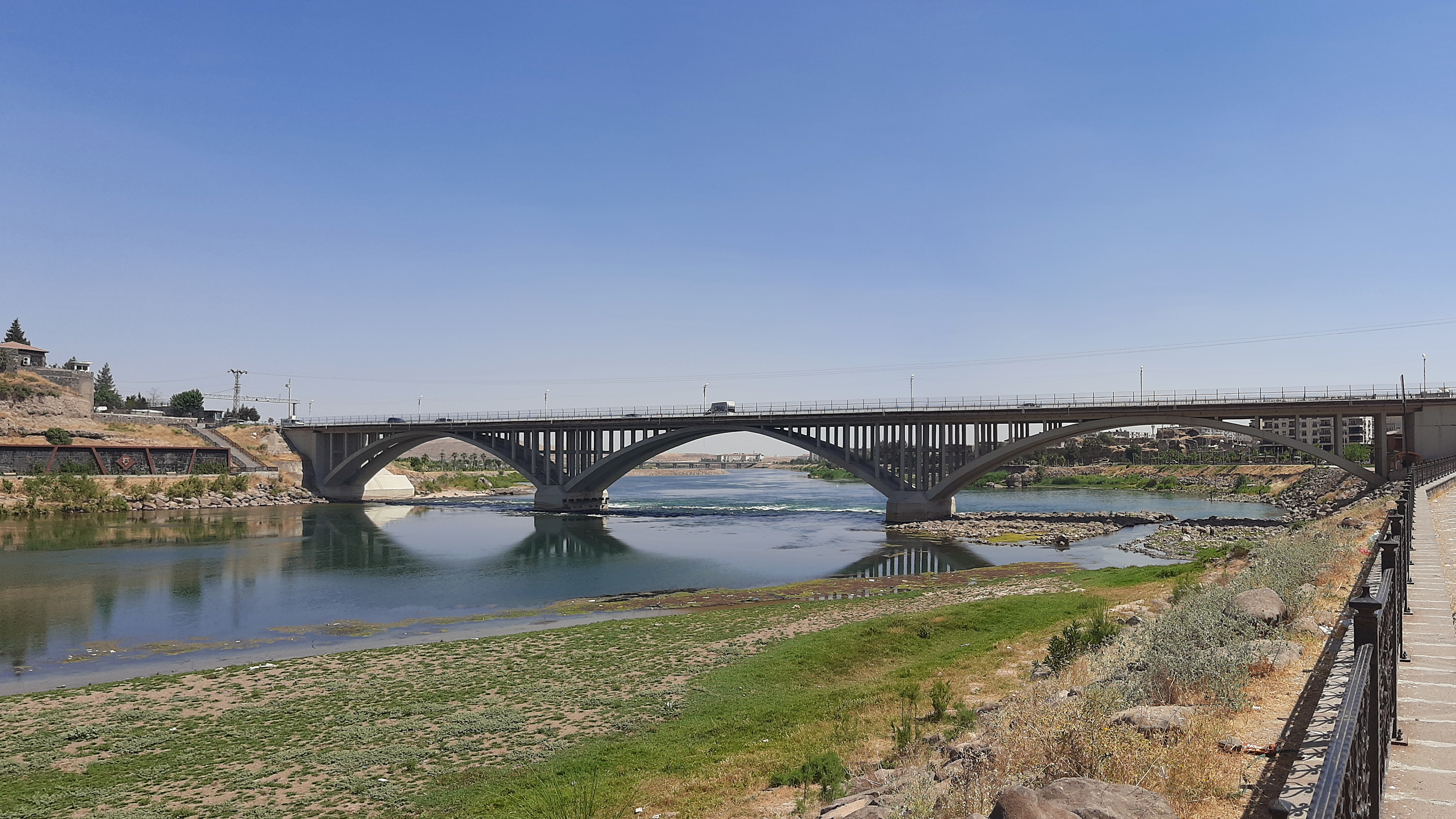
Cizre Bridge

Cizre received electricity and running water in the mid-1950s. In the 1960s, the infrastructure of the city was developed as a new bridge, municipal buildings, and new roads were constructed and streets were widened, and amenities such as a public park named after Atatürk and a cinema were built.

Roughly 60 people were detained and tortured for 20 days by Turkish police after the killing of two Turkish policemen in Cizre on 13 January 1989. The economy of Cizre was severely disrupted by the eruption of the Gulf War as trade with Iraq was embargoed and the border was closed, resulting in the closure of 90% of shops in the city. Kurdish militants clashed with Turkish security forces in Cizre on 18 June 1991, and five Turkish soldiers and one militant were killed, according to official reports, however Amnesty International reported the death of one civilian also. On 21 March 1992, a pro-PKK demonstration to celebrate Newroz in contravention of a state ban was dispersed by Turkish soldiers, and led to violence as Kurdish militants retaliated, resulting in the death of 26-30 people. Properties in Cizre were damaged by Turkish soldiers in two shootouts against PKK militants in August and September 1993, and three militants were killed.

=== Contemporary period ===
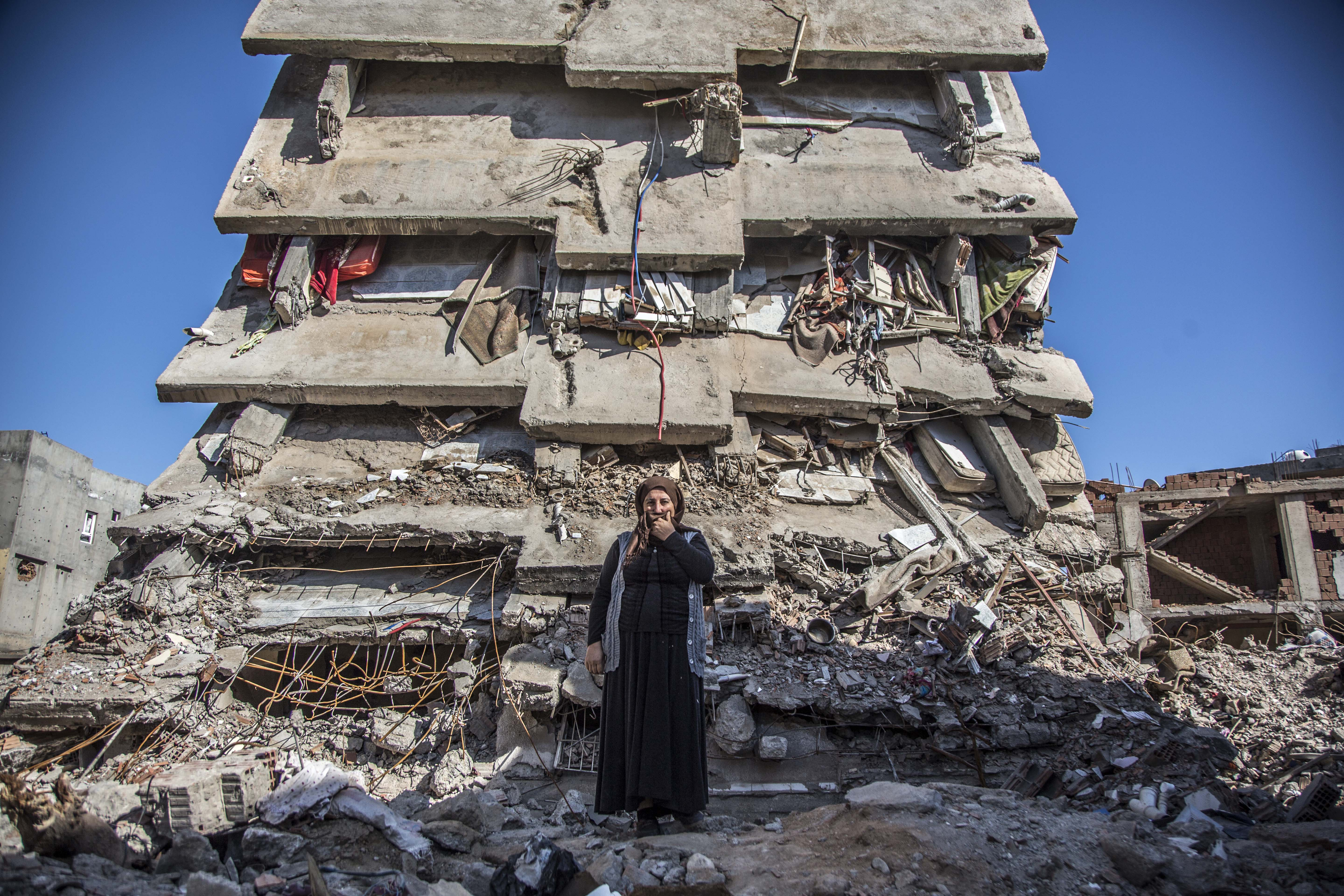
Cizre in the aftermath of the Turkish military operation.

Riots erupted in Cizre in October 2014 in response to the Turkish government's decision to prohibit Kurds from travelling to Syria to participate in the Syrian Civil War, as well as in reaction to accusations that the Turkish government supported the Islamic State (ISIS) against the Kurds in Syria. It is claimed that 17 Kurds from Cizre fought and died in the Siege of Kobanî. Finally, the breakdown of the 2013–2015 PKK–Turkey peace process, which was part of the broader third phase of the Kurdish–Turkish conflict, prompted local Kurdish youth, affiliated with the YDG-H, the militant youth wing of the Kurdistan Workers' Party (PKK), and later YPS, to erect blockades, ditches, and armed checkpoints, declare "autonomy", and to carry out patrols in several neighbourhoods to block the movement of Turkish police.

A military operation was launched by the Turkish Armed Forces to reestablish control over the city on 4 September 2015, and a curfew was imposed, which has also been described as a military siege. An estimated 70 Kurdish militants responded with rocket-propelled grenade attacks, when Turkish soldiers tried to enter the city. From the mountains that surround Cizre, the Turkish army used its heavy armour, including tanks and artillery to shell buildings inflicting great damage. In wake of the clashes, the Turkish Ministry of the Interior claimed that 32 "PKK militants" and 1 civilian had been killed, whereas the Peoples' Democratic Party (HDP) argued that 21 civilians were killed. On 10 September, an investigating delegation of 30 HDP MPs led by Selahattin Demirtaş were denied entry to the city by Turkish police. The curfew was briefly relaxed on 11 September, but was reimposed just two days later. On 14 December 2015, Turkish military operations resumed in Cizre, and the curfew was renewed. The military operation continued until 11 February, but the curfew was maintained until 2 March.

During the clashes between 24 July 2015 and 30 June 2016 at Cizre, the Turkish Armed Forces claimed to have killed or captured 674 PKK militants, and to have suffered 24 killed military and police officers as casualties. The pro-Kurdish Democratic Regions Party (DBP) said in a statement that 300 people had been killed during the curfew. The Union of Chambers of Turkish Engineers and Architects reported that four neighbourhoods were completely destroyed, with 1200 buildings severely damaged and approximately 10,000 buildings damaged, and c. 110,000 people fled the district.

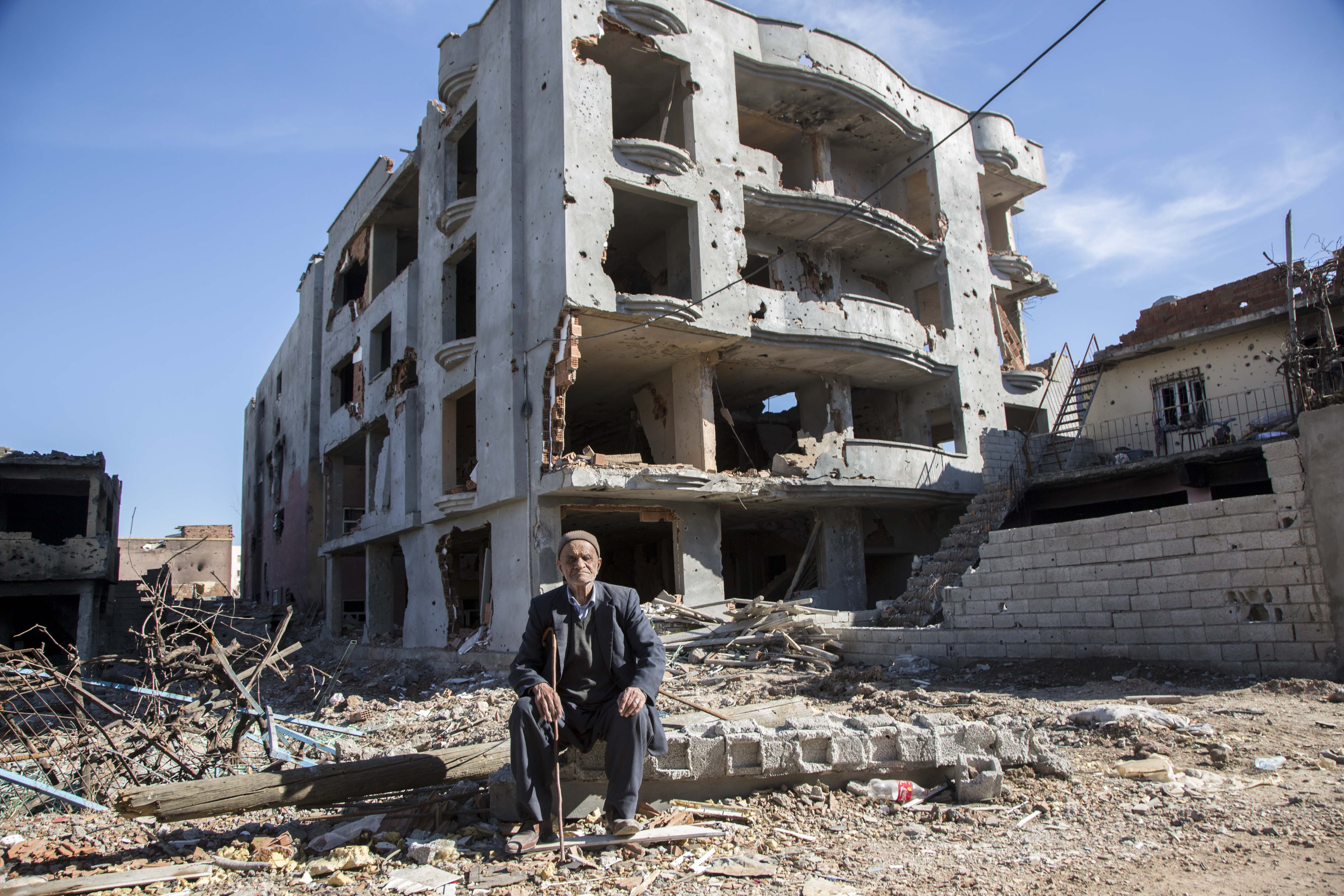
Cizre after the clashes, 2 March 2016.

During the military confrontation, the infamous Cizre basement massacre occurred, in which independent U.N. monitors accused the Turkish military of burning alive more than 100 civilians in a basement by pouring gasoline and setting it on fire. U.N. Human Rights Commissioner Zeid Raad al-Hussein urged Turkey to grant the U.N. unimpeded access to the affected areas following the events and said there were accounts of unarmed civilians, including women and children, being shot by snipers and that government forces also caused "huge damage" to the local infrastructure. The Human Rights Watch (HRW) confirmed these accounts, stating that in some cases the Turkish security forces opened fire on civilians on the streets carrying white flags, deployed military vehicles at the Cizre State Hospital, destroyed residential buildings on a large scale, and deliberately and unjustifiably killed about 130 people, among whom were unarmed civilians and injured combatants, trapped in Cizre's basements. The Association for Human Rights and Solidarity for the Oppressed concluded that between 203 and 266 people were killed during the military curfew, the majority of whom died when Turkish security forces stormed three residential basements where hundreds had been sheltering from the fighting. Kadir Kunur, co-mayor of Cizre said "a total of 176 people were massacred altogether in three basements." A Turkish opposition newspaper said that at least 60 civilians were killed in one of the basements.

Furthermore, the HRW accused the Turkish government of blocking access for independent investigations into alleged mass abuses against civilians, including unlawful killings of civilians, mass forced displacement, and widespread unlawful destruction of private property.

The Turkish government announced plans in April 2016 to rebuild damaged 2700 houses in a project estimated to cost 4 billion Turkish lira. The Turkish physician Dr Şebnem Korur Fincanci was arrested and imprisoned on charges of involvement in the propaganda of terrorism by the Turkish government on 20 June 2016 as a consequence of her report on conditions in Cizre after the end of the curfew in March 2016; she was later acquitted in July 2019. On 26 August 2016, 11 policemen were killed and 78 were injured in a car bomb attack, which was attributed to the PKK. The attack targeted a police checkpoint and severely damaged a nearby riot police headquarters. The Turkish government banned journalists and independent observers from entering the city to report on the bombing.

== Ecclesiastical history ==
=== East Syriac ===
At the city's foundation in the early 9th century, it was included in the diocese of Qardu, a suffragan of the Archdiocese of Nisibis in the Church of the East. In c. 900, the diocese of Bezabde was moved and renamed to Gazarta, and partially assumed the territory of the diocese of Qardu, which was also moved and renamed to its new seat Tamanon, having previously been based at Penek. Tamanon declined and at some point after the mention of its last bishop in 1265, its diocese was subsumed into the diocese of Gazarta.

Eliya was archbishop of Gazarta and Amid in 1504. Gazarta was a prominent centre of manuscript production, and most surviving east Syriac manuscripts from the late 16th century were copied there.

The Catholic Church of Mosul, later known as the Chaldean Catholic Church, split from the Church of the East in the schism of 1552, and its inaugural patriarch Shimun VIII Yohannan Sulaqa appointed Abdisho as archbishop of Gazarta in 1553. Shemon VII Ishoyahb, Patriarch of the Church of the East, appointed Joseph as archbishop of Gazarta in response in 1554. Abdisho succeeded Sulaqa as patriarch on his death in 1555.

Gabriel was archbishop of Gazarta in 1586. There was an archbishop of Gazarta named John in 1594. Joseph was archbishop of Gazarta in 1610. A certain Joseph, archbishop of Gazarta, is mentioned in a manuscript in 1618 with the patriarch Eliya IX. An archbishop of Gazarta named Joseph is also mentioned in a manuscript in 1657.

Joseph, archbishop of Gazarta, resided at the village of Shah in 1822. An archbishop named Joseph had two suffragan bishops, and served until his death in 1846.

In 1850, the Church of the East diocese of Gazarta had 23 villages, 23 churches, 16 priests, and 220 families, whereas the Chaldean diocese of Gazarta had 7 villages, 6 churches, 5 priests, and 179 families. The Chaldean Catholic Church expanded considerably in the second half of the 19th century, and consequently its diocese of Gazarta grew to 20 villages, 15 priests, and 7,000 adherents in 1867. The Chaldean diocese decreased to 5200 adherents, with 17 churches and 14 priests, in 1896, but recovered by 1913 to 6400 adherents in 17 villages, with 11 churches and 17 priests.

=== West Syriac ===
==== Syriac Orthodox ====
The Syriac Orthodox diocese of Gazarta was established in 864, and supplanted the diocese of Bezabde. It is first mentioned under the authority of the maphrian in the tenure of Dionysius I Moses (r. 1112–1142). There were 19 villages in the Syriac Orthodox diocese of Azakh and Gazarta in 1915.

The following is a list of incumbents of the see:

- Iwanis (1040)
- Basil (1173)
- John Wahb (1265–1280), ordained by maphrian Gregory bar Hebraeus.
- Dioscorus Gabriel of Bartella (1284–1300), ordained by maphrian Gregory bar Hebraeus.
- 'Abd Allah of Bartella (1326)
- Iyawannis of Basibrina (1329–1335) (Note: Iyawannis of Basibrina was archbishop of Nisibin and Gazarta.)
- Iyawannis Barsoum of Arbo (1415–1457)
- Dioscorus Simon of Ayn Ward (1483–1501)
- Dioscorus George (1677–1684), ordained by maphrian Baselios Yeldo.
- Dioscorus Shukr Allah (1687–1691), ordained by maphrian Basil Isaac.
- Dioscorus Saliba (1691–1698), ordained by Patriarch Ignatius George II at the church of the Virgin Mary at Aleppo.
- Dioscorus Murad (1698–1716), ordained by maphrian Basil Isaac.
- Dioscorus Aho (1718–?), ordained by Patriarch Ignatius Isaac II.
- Dioscorus Shukr Allah (1743/1745–c. 1785), ordained by Patriarch Ignatius Shukrallah II.
- Athanasius Stephan (d. 1869)
- Julius Behnam of Aqrah (1871–1927), ordained by Patriarch Ignatius Peter IV at the church of Umm al-Zunnar at Homs. In 1916, he was represented by Iyawannis Shakir, archbishop of Mosul, at the synod held at the Mor Hananyo Monastery to elect a new patriarch.

==== Syriac Catholic ====
The Syriac Catholic diocese of Gazarta was established in 1863, and endured until its suppression in 1957. The following is a list of incumbents of the see:

- Flavianus Pietro Matah (1863 – death 1874)
- Giacomo Matteo Ahmndahño (1888.10.10 – death 1908)
- Blessed Flavianus Michael Malke (1912.09.14 – 1915.08.29)

== Government ==
=== Mayors ===
Seyyit Haşim Haşimi was RP mayor of Cizre in 1989–1994. Haşimi was detained by police in the summer of 1993 on suspicion of aiding the PKK; Saki Işıkçı was deputy mayor at this time.

On 29 October 2019, Mehmet Zırığ, HDP co-mayor of Cizre, who was elected in the 2019 Turkish local elections with 77% of the vote, was removed from office by the Governor of Şırnak amidst an investigation into charges of "praising the crime and the criminal", "propagandising for a terrorist organisation", and "being a member of a terrorist organisation", and kaymakam (district governor) Davut Sinanoğlu was appointed as acting mayor. Berivan Kutlu, HDP co-mayor of Cizre, was detained by police on 12–19 March 2020.

== Demography ==
=== Population ===
Until 1915, Cizre had a diverse population of Christian Armenians and Assyrians, Jews, and Muslim Kurds. The genocide of Armenians and Assyrians reduced the city's population significantly, and it declined further with the departure of the Jews in 1950–1951. The population began to recover in the second half of the 20th century, and later increased dramatically from 1984 onwards due to the Kurdish–Turkish conflict as thousands of people fled to Cizre to escape pressure from both the Turkish armed forces and PKK militants.

Historical population

Year	Pop.	±% p.a.
1850	4,000	—
1890	9,560	+2.20%
1918	7,500	−0.86%
1940	5,575	−1.34%
1960	6,473	+0.75%
1980	20,200	+5.86%
1985	29,496	+7.87%

Year	Pop.	±% p.a.
1990	50,023	+11.14%
1997	63,344	+3.43%
2007	90,477	+3.63%
2012	106,831	+3.38%
2017	118,953	+2.17%
2022	134,041	+2.42%

Source: Wilmshurst (1850), Elisséeff (1890, 1940, 1960), Henning (1918), Marcus (1980), Population censuses (1985-1997) and TÜIK (2007-2022)

=== Religion ===
==== Christian population ====
In the Syriac Orthodox patriarchal register of dues of 1870, it was recorded that the city had 32 Syriac Orthodox households, who paid 107 dues, and was served by the Church of Morī Behnān and one priest. According to the census carried out by the Armenian Patriarchate of Constantinople, 4281 Armenians inhabited the kaza of Jazirat Ibn ʿUmar in 1913, with only one functioning church: 2716 Armenians lived in Jazirat Ibn ʿUmar itself and eleven nearby villages, and 1565 Armenians were nomadic. 60 Chaldean Catholic families inhabited the city in 1850, and were served by one church and one priest. There were 300 Chaldeans in 1865, 240 Chaldeans in 1880, 320 Chaldeans in 1888, 350 Chaldeans in 1890, and 600 Chaldeans, with 2 priests and 2 churches, in 1913.

A report submitted to the Paris Peace Conference by the Syriac Orthodox bishop Severios Barsoum in July 1919 testified that 7510 Syriac Orthodox Christians in 994 families and 8 clergymen had been killed in the kaza of Jazirat Ibn ʿUmar during the genocide. 26 Syriac Orthodox villages and 13 churches had been affected. In total, 35 Assyrian villages in the vicinity of Cizre were destroyed in the genocide. A separate memorandum was submitted on behalf of Shimun XX Paulos, Patriarch of the Church of the East, in which it was requested that the city become part of an independent Assyrian state.

After the genocide, in 1918, it was reported Kurds made up the majority of the city, with approximately 500 Chaldeans. There were 960 Assyrians at Cizre in total in 1918.

==== Jewish population ====
The Jewish community of Cizre is attested by Benjamin of Tudela in the mid-12th century, and he noted the city was inhabited by 4000 Jews led by rabbis named Muvhar, Joseph, and Hiyya. J. J. Benjamin remarked on the presence of 20 Jewish families in Cizre during his visit in 1848. Jews of Cizre spoke Judaeo-Aramaic and Kurdish. There were 10 Jewish households in Cizre when visited by Rabbi Yehiel Fischel in 1859, and were described as very poor. 126 Jews inhabited Cizre in 1891, as recorded by the Ottoman census. The community had grown to 150 people by 1906, and the synagogue was renovated in 1913. In 1914, 234 Jews inhabited Cizre. The Jewish community of Cizre emigrated to Israel in 1950–1951. The Israeli politician Mickey Levy is a notable descendant of the Jews of Cizre.

==== Kurdish population ====
The town is presently populated by Kurds of the Aluwa, Amara, Elîkan, Kiçan and Meman tribes.

== Culture ==
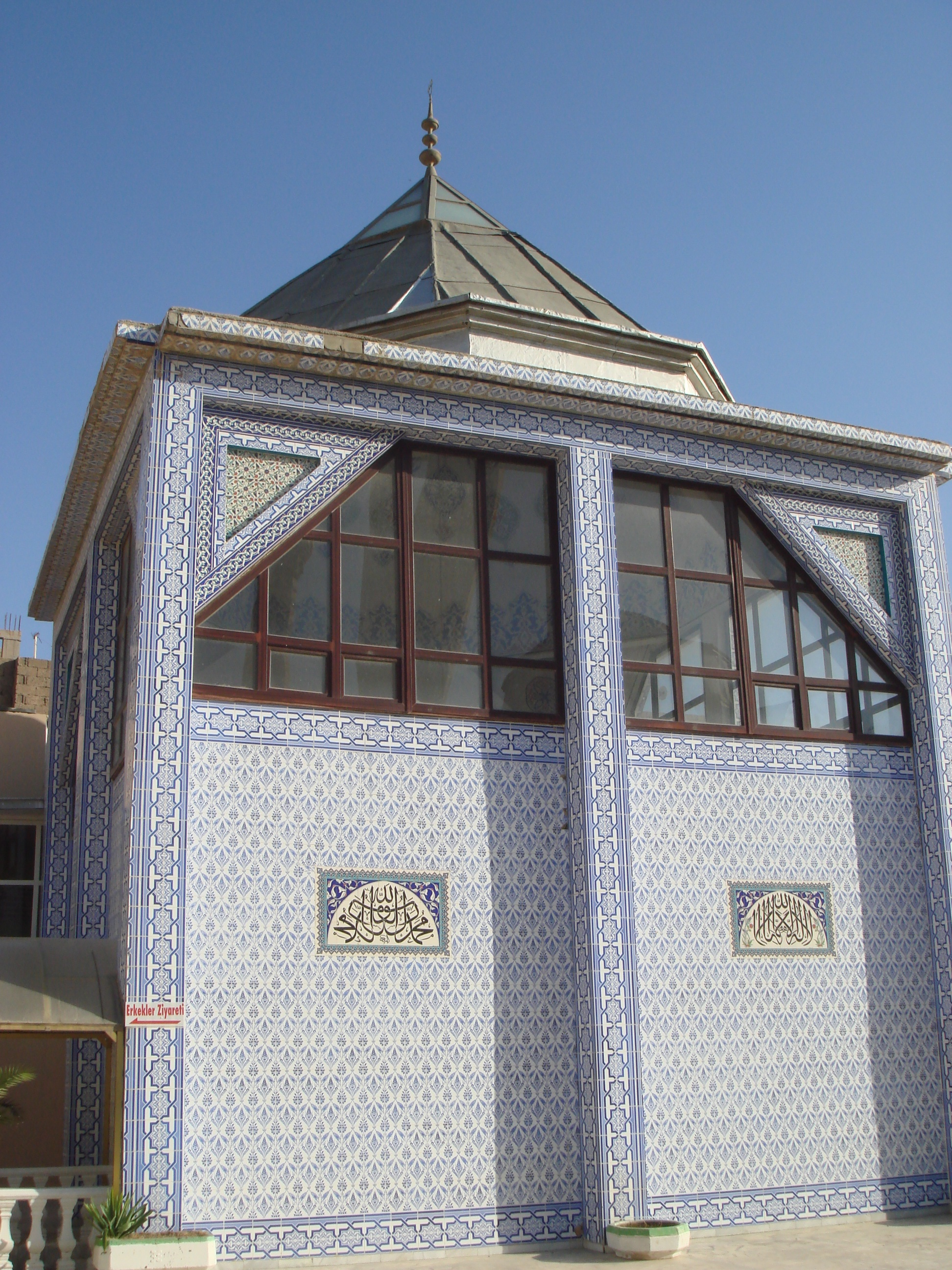
The Tomb of Nuh (Noah)

As the capital of the Bohtan emirate, Cizre served as an important Kurdish cultural centre, and music, poetry, and science flourished under the protection of the emirs.

=== Education ===
Cizre formerly played a significant role in the dissemination of Islamic education in Upper Mesopotamia. In the 11th century, a madrasa was constructed by the Seljuk vizier Nizam al-Mulk. In the following century, there were four Shafi'i madrasas, and two Sufi khanqahs outside the city walls. The two Sufi khanqahs were noted by Izz al-Din ibn Shaddad in the 13th century, and he also recorded the names of the four Shafi'i madrasas as Ibn el-Bezri Madrasa, Zahiruddin Kaymaz al-Atabegi Madrasa, Radaviyye Madrasa and Kadi Cemaleddin Abdürrahim Madrasa.

Until 1915, French Dominican priests operated a Chaldean Catholic school and Syriac Catholic school in the city, as well as other schools of those denominations in the vicinity.

=== Monuments ===
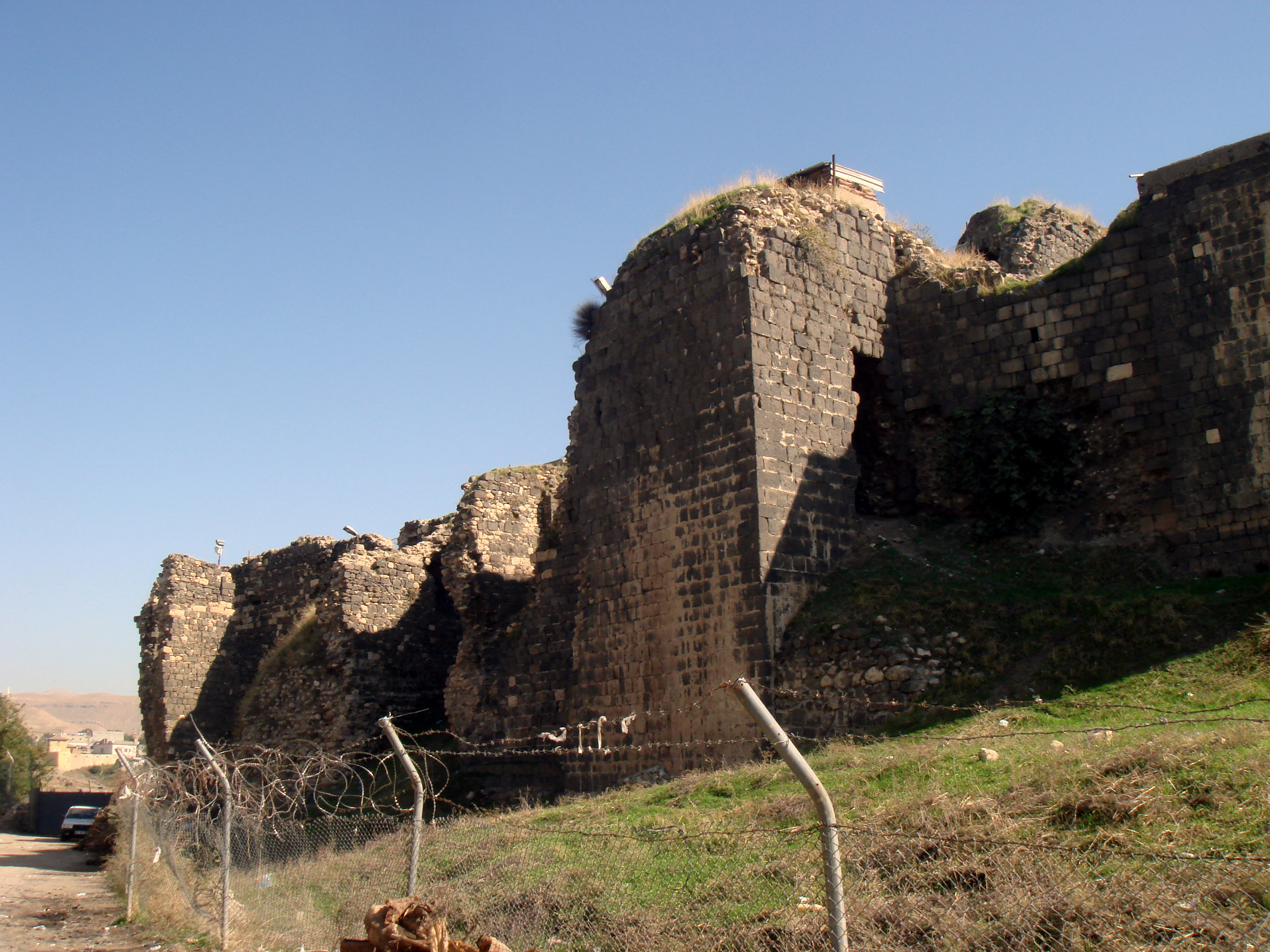
The citadel of Cizre

==== Religious ====
In the 12th century, there was a bimaristan (hospital), 19 mosques, 14 hammams (baths), and 30 sabils (fountains). This increased to two bimaristans, two grand mosques, 80 mosques, and 14 hammams when recorded by Ibn Shaddad in the next century.

Cizre became a place of pilgrimage in the 15th century due to its association with Nuh (Noah), and it attracted notable figures, such as the Ottoman Sultan Mehmed the Conqueror and potentially also his sons. The Mosque of the Prophet Noah in Cizre purports to contain his tomb. The tomb of the Kurdish poet Ali Hariri (1425–c. 1495), who died at Cizre, is considered sacred and visited by pilgrims.

The Syriac Orthodox Church of Mar Behnam was renovated by Gregorius Jacob, archbishop of Gargar, in 1704. Gregorius Thomas, archbishop of Jerusalem, was buried at the Church of Mar Behnam in 1748 behind the right wing of the altar; his grave and an inscription in Garshuni was still extant when visited by Aphrem Barsoum in 1910. A number of archbishops of Gazarta were also buried here, including Dioscorus Gabriel of Bartella (d. 7 September 1300), Dioscorus Shukr Allah (d. c. 1785), and Athanasius Stephan (d. 1869).

==== Secular ====
The citadel of Cizre (Kurdish: Birca Belek, 'multicoloured palace') was constructed by the emirate of Bohtan, and is prominently presented as the residence of Zin in the tale of Mem and Zin. After the emirate's dissolution in 1847, the citadel was periodically used as a barracks by Turkish soldiers, and was closed to the public. It remained in military use, and was used by Turkish border guards from 1995 onwards, until 2010. Excavations by archaeologists from Mardin Museum began in May 2013, and continued until December 2014.

=== Sport ===
Cizre Serhat Sports Club (Turkish: Cizre Serhat Spor Kulübü) was founded in 1972, and later renamed to Cizrespor.

== Geography ==
Cizre is located at the easternmost point of the Tur Abdin in the Melabas Hills (Syriac: Turo d-Malbash, "the clothed mountain"), which is roughly coterminous with the region of Zabdicene.

=== Climate ===
Cizre has a Mediterranean climate (Csa in the Köppen climate classification) with wet, cool, occasionally snowy winters and dry, extremely hot summers. On 25 July 2025, Cizre recorded 49.4 °C (120.9 °F), setting a new highest temperature record for the city. The previous highest temperature records in Turkey at 49.1 °C (120.4 °F) on 20 July 2021 and at 49.0 °C (120.2 °F) on 27 August 1961 were recorded in Cizre. Cizre's 62-year-long highest temperature record was surpassed two years later in Sarıcakaya, Eskişehir Province in northwest Turkey.

Climate data for Cizre (1991–2020)
Month	Jan	Feb	Mar	Apr	May	Jun	Jul	Aug	Sep	Oct	Nov	Dec	Year
Mean daily maximum °C (°F)	11.8 (53.2)	13.7 (56.7)	18.4 (65.1)	24.0 (75.2)	31.0 (87.8)	38.4 (101.1)	42.3 (108.1)	42.0 (107.6)	37.3 (99.1)	30.0 (86.0)	20.4 (68.7)	14.0 (57.2)	27.0 (80.6)
Daily mean °C (°F)	7.0 (44.6)	8.7 (47.7)	12.9 (55.2)	17.6 (63.7)	24.0 (75.2)	31.0 (87.8)	34.7 (94.5)	34.0 (93.2)	28.9 (84.0)	22.2 (72.0)	13.8 (56.8)	8.7 (47.7)	20.4 (68.7)
Mean daily minimum °C (°F)	3.3 (37.9)	4.5 (40.1)	7.9 (46.2)	11.8 (53.2)	16.7 (62.1)	22.3 (72.1)	25.5 (77.9)	24.7 (76.5)	20.3 (68.5)	15.4 (59.7)	8.9 (48.0)	5.0 (41.0)	13.9 (57.0)
Average precipitation mm (inches)	115.99 (4.57)	109.02 (4.29)	109.56 (4.31)	72.83 (2.87)	32.06 (1.26)	3.16 (0.12)	0.84 (0.03)	0.51 (0.02)	2.73 (0.11)	27.26 (1.07)	66.4 (2.61)	112.32 (4.42)	652.68 (25.70)
Average precipitation days (≥ 1.0 mm)	9.5	9.0	9.1	7.5	4.6	1.5	1.0	1.0	1.3	3.9	5.9	8.4	62.7
Average relative humidity (%)	70.7	67.0	62.5	59.3	46.9	30.9	27.2	27.9	32.1	45.4	62.3	70.6	49.8
Source: NOAA

== Notable people ==
- Ismail al-Jazari (1136–1206), scholar
- Majd ad-Dīn Ibn Athir (1149–1210), historian
- Ali ibn al-Athir (1160–1233), historian
- Abdisho IV Maron (r. 1555–1570), Chaldean Catholic Patriarch of Babylon
- Melayê Cizîrî (1570–1640), Kurdish poet
- Bedir Khan Beg (1803–1868), Emir of Bohtan
- Şerafettin Elçi (1938–2012), Kurdish politician
- Selim Acar (b. 1961), businessman
- Tahir Elçi (1966–2015), Kurdish lawyer
- Halil Savda (b. 1974), Kurdish conscientious objector
- Faysal Sarıyıldız (b. 1975), Kurdish politician
- Nuran İmir (b. 1977), Kurdish politician
- Leyla İmret (b. 1987), Kurdish politician

== Bibliography ==
Primary sources

- Gregory bar Hebraeus (1932). Chronography. Translated by E. A. W. Budge. Oxford University Press.
- Ibn al-Athir (2002). The Annals of the Saljuq Turks: Selections from al-Kamil fi'l-Ta'rikh of Ibn al-Athir. Translated by D.S. Richards. Routledge.

Secondary sources

- Açıkyıldız Şengül, Birgül (2014). "Cizre Kırmızı Medrese:Mimari, İktidar ve Tarih". Kebikeç (in Turkish). 38: 169–198.
- Ali, Othman (1997). "The Kurds and the Lausanne Peace Negotiations, 1922-23". Middle Eastern Studies. 33 (3): 521–534. doi:10.1080/00263209708701167.
- Amitai-Preiss, Reuven (2004). Mongols and Mamluks: The Mamluk-Ilkhanid War, 1260-1281. Cambridge University Press.
- Ateş, Sabri (2013). Ottoman-Iranian Borderlands: Making a Boundary, 1843–1914. Cambridge University Press.
- Badem, Candan (2010). The Ottoman Crimean War (1853-1856). Brill.
- Barsoum, Aphrem (2003). The Scattered Pearls: A History of Syriac Literature and Sciences. Translated by Matti Moosa (2nd ed.). Gorgias Press.
- Barsoum, Aphrem (2008a). History of the Za'faran Monastery. Translated by Matti Moosa. Gorgias Press.
- Barsoum, Aphrem (2008b). The History of Tur Abdin. Translated by Matti Moosa. Gorgias Press.
- Barsoum, Aphrem (2009a). History of the Syriac Dioceses. Vol. 1. Translated by Matti Moosa. Gorgias Press.
- Barsoum, Aphrem (2009b). The Collected Historical Essays of Aphram I Barsoum. Vol. 1. Translated by Matti Moosa. Gorgias Press.
- Baz, Ibrahim (2016). Şırnak aşiretleri ve kültürü (in Turkish). ISBN 9786058849631.
- Bcheiry, Iskandar (2009). The Syriac Orthodox Patriarchal Register of Dues of 1870: An Unpublished Historical Document from the Late Ottoman Period. Gorgias Press.
- Beihammer, Alexander Daniel (2017). Byzantium & Emergence of Muslim-Turkish Anatolia, c.1040-1130. Routledge.
- Benjamin, Israel Joseph (1859). Eight years in Asia and Africa from 1846-1855. Routledge.
- Biner, Zerrin Özlem (2020). States of Dispossession: Violence and Precarious Coexistence in Southeast Turkey. University of Pennsylvania Press.
- Boyle, J. A. (2007). The Cambridge History of Iran, Volume 5: The Saljuq and Mongol Periods. Cambridge University Press.
- Brock, Sebastian (2017). "A Historical Note of October 1915 Written in Dayro D-Zafaran (Deyrulzafaran)". In David Gaunt; Naures Atto; Soner O. Barthoma (eds.). Let Them Not Return: Sayfo – The Genocide against the Assyrian, Syriac and Chaldean Christians in the Ottoman Empire (PDF). pp. 148–156.
- Brock, Sebastian (2021). "The Syrian Orthodox Church in the twentieth century". Eastern Christianity, Theological Reflection on Religion, Culture, and Politics in the Holy Land and Christian Encounter with Islam and the Muslim World (PDF). Living Stones of the Holy Land Trust. pp. 155–181.
- Bruinessen, Martin Van; Boeschoten, Hendrik (1988). Evliya Çelebi in Diyarbekir. Brill.
- Burak, Durdu Mehmet (2005). "EL-CEZİRE KUMANDANI NİHAT PAŞA'NIN EŞKIYA TARAFINDAN SOYULMASI" (PDF). Gazi Üniversitesi Kırşehir Eğitim Fakültesi Dergisi (in Turkish). 6 (1): 169–183. Archived from the original (PDF) on 2020-07-15.
- Busse, Heribert (2008). "Iran Under the Buyids". In Richard Nelson Frye (ed.). The Cambridge History of Iran, Volume 4: From the Arab Invasion to the Saljuqs. Cambridge University Press. pp. 250–305.
- Cahen, Claude (1969). "The Turkish Invasion: The Selchukids". In Marshall W. Baldwin (ed.). A History of the Crusades, Volume I: The First Hundred Years. University of Wisconsin Press. pp. 135–177.
- Canard, Marius (1986). "Ḥamdānids". Encyclopaedia of Islam, Second Edition. Vol. 3. pp. 126–131.
- Çetinoğlu, Sait (2018). "Genocide/ Seyfo – and how resistance became a way of life". In Hannibal Travis (ed.). The Assyrian Genocide: Cultural and Political Legacies (PDF). Routledge. pp. 178–191.
- Chaliand, Gerard, ed. (1980). A People without a Country: The Kurds and Kurdistan. Translated by Michael Pallis. Zed Press.
- Chyet, Michael L. (2020). FERHENGA BIRÛSKÎ Kurmanji - English Dictionary. Vol. One: A - L. Transnational Press London.
- Courtois, Sébastien de (2013). "Tur Abdin : Réflexions sur l'état présent descommunautés syriaques du Sud-Est de la Turquie, mémoire, exils, retours". Cahier du Gremmamo (in French). 21: 113–150.
- Crow, James (2018). "Bezabde". In Nicholson, Oliver (ed.). The Oxford Dictionary of Late Antiquity. Oxford University Press. ISBN 978-0-19-866277-8.
- El-Azhari, Taef (2016). Zengi and the Muslim Response to the Crusades: The politics of Jihad. Routledge.
- Elisséeff, Nur ad-Din (1986). "Ibn ʿUmar, D̲j̲azīrat". Encyclopaedia of Islam, Second Edition. Vol. 3. pp. 960–961.
- Galante, Avram (1948). Histoire des Juifs de Turquie (in French).
- Gil, Moshe (2004). Jews in Islamic countries in the Middle Ages. Translated by David Strassler. Brill.
- Heidemann, Stefan (2002). "Zangids". Encyclopaedia of Islam, Second Edition. Vol. 11. pp. 452–455.
- Henning, Barbara (2018). Narratives of the History of the Ottoman-Kurdish Bedirhani Family in Imperial and Post-Imperial Contexts: Continuities and Changes (PDF). University of Bamberg Press.
- Hillenbrand, Carole (1991). "Marwanids". Encyclopaedia of Islam, Second Edition. Vol. 6. pp. 626–627.
- Humphreys, R. Stephen (1977). From Saladin to the Mongols: The Ayyubids of Damascus, 1193-1260. State University of New York Press.
- Ignatius Jacob III (2008). History of the Monastery of Saint Matthew in Mosul. Translated by Matti Moosa. Gorgias Press.
- Jackson, Peter (2017). The Mongols and the Islamic World: From Conquest to Conversion. Yale University Press.
- James, Boris (2019). "Constructing the Realm of the Kurds (al-Mamlaka al-Akradiyya): Kurdish In-betweenness and Mamluk Ethnic Engineering (1130-1340 CE)". In Steve Tamari (ed.). Grounded Identities: Territory and Belonging in the Medieval and Early Modern Middle East and Mediterranean. Brill. pp. 17–45.
- Jongerden, Joost; Verheij, Jelle, eds. (2012). Social Relations in Ottoman Diyarbekir, 1870-1915. Brill.
- Jwaideh, Wadie (2006). The Kurdish National Movement: Its Origins and Development. Syracuse University Press.
- Kana'an, Ruba (2013). "The Biography of a Thirteenth-century Brass Ewer from Mosul". In Sheila Blair; Jonathan M. Bloom (eds.). God Is Beautiful and Loves Beauty: The Object in Islamic Art and Culture. Yale University Press. pp. 176–193.
- Kaplan, Kaan (26 June 2023). "The Relation between Al-Jazari of the East and Leonardo da Vinci of the West". Ortaçağ Araştırmaları Dergisi. 6 (1): 300–311. doi:10.48120/oad.1264652.
- Karpat, Kemal Haşim (1985). Ottoman Population, 1830-1914: Demographic and Social Characteristics. University of Wisconsin Press.
- Kaymak, Wedat (1990). Les éternels exilés (PDF) (in French). Paris: Association des Cinéastes Kurdes en Exil.
- Kennedy, Hugh (2004). The Prophet and the Age of the Caliphates: The Islamic Near East from the Sixth to the Eleventh Century. Pearson Education.
- Kennedy, Hugh (2011). "The Feeding of the five Hundred Thousand: Cities and Agriculture in Early Islamic Mesopotamia". Iraq. 73: 177–199. doi:10.1017/S0021088900000152.
- Kévorkian, Raymond (2011). The Armenian Genocide: A Complete History. Palgrave Macmillan.
- Kieser, Hans-Lukas (2011). "From "Patriotism" to Mass Murder: Dr Mehmed Reşid (1873-1919)". In Ronald Grigor Suny; Fatma Müge Göçek; Norman M. Naimark (eds.). A Question of Genocide: Armenians and Turks at the End of the Ottoman Empire. Oxford University Press. pp. 126–151.
- Kiraz, George A. (2011). "Giwargis II, Ignatius". Gorgias Encyclopedic Dictionary of the Syriac Heritage: Electronic Edition. Gorgias Press.
- Klein, Janet (2011). The Margins of Empire: Kurdish Militias in the Ottoman Tribal Zone. Stanford University Press.
- Lightfoot, C.S. (1981). The Eastern Frontier of the Roman Empire with special reference to the reign of Constantius II.
- Mango, Andrew (2013). "Atatürk and the Kurds". In Sylvia Kedourie (ed.). Seventy-five Years of the Turkish Republic. Routledge. pp. 1–26.
- Marcus, Aliza (1994). "City in the War Zone". Middle East Report (189): 16–19. doi:10.2307/3013106. JSTOR 3013106.
- Mazzola, Marianna (2019). "Centralism and Local Tradition : A Reappraisal of the Sources on the Metropolis of Tagrit and Mor Matay". Le Muséon. 132 (3–4): 399–413.
- Miynat, Ali (2017). Cultural and socio-economic relations between the Turkmen states and the Byzantine empire and West with a corpus of the Turkmen coins in the Barber Institute Coin Collection (PDF).
- Mutzafi, Hezy (2008). The Jewish Neo-Aramaic Dialect of Betanure (Province of Dihok). Otto Harrassowitz Verlag.
- Nicolle, David (2013). "The Zangid bridge of Ǧazīrat ibn ʿUmar (ʿAyn Dīwār/Cizre): A New Look at the carved panel of an armoured horseman". Bulletin d'études orientales. 62: 223–264.
- Özoğlu, Hakan (2001). ""Nationalism" and Kurdish Notables in the Late Ottoman–Early Republican Era". International Journal of Middle East Studies. 33 (3): 383–409. doi:10.1017/S0020743801003038. S2CID 154897102.
- Özoğlu, Hakan (2004). Kurdish Notables and the Ottoman State: Evolving Identities, Competing Loyalties, and Shifting Boundaries. SUNY Press.
- Palmer, Andrew (1990). Monk and Mason on the Tigris Frontier: The Early History of Tur Abdin. Cambridge University Press.
- Patton, Douglas (1991). "Badr al-Dīn Lu'lu' and the Establishment of a mamluk Government in Mosul". Studia Islamica. 74 (74). Brill: 79–103. doi:10.2307/1595898. JSTOR 1595898.
- Pfeiffer, Judith (2013). "Confessional Ambiguity vs. Confessional Polarisation: Politics and the Negotiation of Religious Boundaries in the Ilkhanate". In Judith Pfeiffer (ed.). Politics, Patronage and the Transmission of Knowledge in 13th-15th Century Tabriz. Brill. pp. 129–171.
- Quataert, Donald (1994). "The Age of Reforms, 1812-1914". In Halil İnalcık; Donald Quataert (eds.). An Economic and Social History of the Ottoman Empire, 1300-1914. Cambridge University Press. pp. 759–947.
- Rassi, Salam (2015). Justifying Christianity in the Islamic Middle Ages: The Apologetic Theology of ʿAbdīshōʿ bar Brīkhā (d. 1318).
- Rhétoré, Jacques (2005). Les chrétiens aux bêtes: souvenirs de la guerre sainte proclamée par les Turcs contre les chrétiens en 1915 (in French). Editions du CERF.
- Roberts, Sean (2013). Printing a Mediterranean World: Florence, Constantinople, and the Renaissance of Geography. Harvard University Press.
- Sabar, Yona (2002). A Jewish Neo-Aramaic Dictionary: Dialects of Amidya, Dihok, Nerwa and Zakho, Northwestern Iraq. Otto Harrassowitz Verlag.
- Şanlı, Süleyman (2017). "An Overview of Historical Background of Unknown Eastern Jews of Turkey". Mukaddime. 8 (1): 67–82.
- Sato, Noriko (2001). Memory and Social Identity among Syrian Orthodox Christians (PDF).
- Sinclair, T.A. (1989). Eastern Turkey: An Architectural & Archaeological Survey, Volume III. Pindar Press. ISBN 9780907132349.
- Sinclair, Thomas (2019). Eastern Trade and the Mediterranean in the Middle Ages: Pegolotti's Ayas-Tabriz Itinerary and its Commercial Context. Routledge.
- Snelders, Bas (2010). "The Syrian Orthodox in their Historical and Artistic Settings". Identity and Christian-Muslim Interaction: Medieval Art of the Syrian Orthodox from the Mosul area (PDF).
- Taner, Melis (14 October 2019). Caught in a Whirlwind: A Cultural History of Ottoman Baghdad as Reflected in Its Illustrated Manuscripts. BRILL. ISBN 978-90-04-41280-4.
- Taylor, Gordon (2007). Fever and Thirst: An American Doctor Among the Tribes of Kurdistan, 1835-1844. Chicago Review Press.
- Ternon, Yves (2002). Revue d'histoire arménienne contemporaine: Mardin 1915: Anatomie pathologique d'une destruction. Vol. 4.
- Touzard, Anne-Marie (2000). "FRANCE vii. FRENCH TRAVELERS IN PERSIA, 1600-1730". Encyclopaedia Iranica.
- ul-Hasan, Mahmood (2005). Ibn Al-At̲h̲ir: An Arab Historian : a Critical Analysis of His Tarikh-al-kamil and Tarikh-al-atabeca. Northern Book Centre.
- Üngör, Uğur; Polatel, Mehmet (2011). Confiscation and Destruction: The Young Turk Seizure of Armenian Property. Bloomsbury Publishing.
- Üngör, Uğur (2012). The Making of Modern Turkey: Nation and State in Eastern Anatolia, 1913-1950. Oxford University Press.
- Wilmshurst, David (2000). The Ecclesiastical Organisation of the Church of the East, 1318–1913 (PDF). Peeters Publishers.
- Yacoub, Joseph (2016). Year of the Sword: The Assyrian Christian Genocide, A History. Translated by James Ferguson. Oxford University Press.
- Zaken, Mordechai (2007). Jewish Subjects and Their Tribal Chieftains in Kurdistan: A Study in Survival. Brill.
- Zawanowska, Marzena (2019). "Yefet ben ʿEli on Genesis 11 and 22". In Meira Polliack; Athalya Brenner-Idan (eds.). Jewish Biblical Exegesis from Islamic Lands: The Medieval Period. SBL Press. pp. 33–61.
