= Christianity in Turkey =

Turkish Christians Türk Hristiyanlar
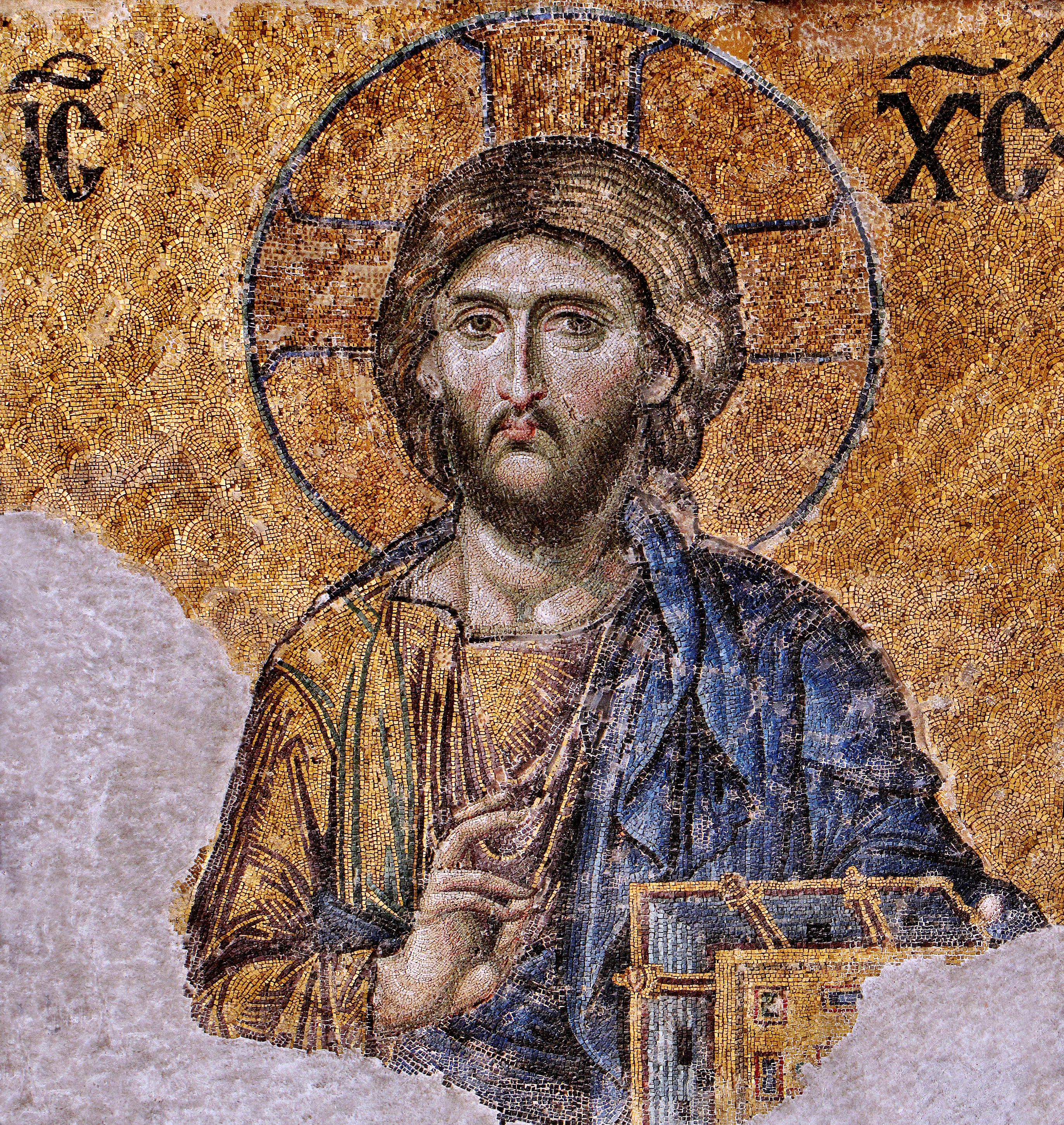
- Christ Pantocrator, detail of the Deesis mosaic in the former Basilica of Hagia Sophia, Istanbul

Total population
- Est. 403,500–570,000+

Religions
- Christianity (mostly Eastern Orthodox, Armenian Apostolic and Roman Catholic)

Languages
- Arabic, Armenian, Bulgarian, Ecclesiastical Latin, English, Georgian, Greek (Liturgical), Korean, Persian, Russian, Syriac, Turkish, Ukrainian

Map of the Greek-Orthodox metropolises in Asia Minor, c. 1880

Christianity in Turkey has a long history, dating back to the early origins of Christianity in Asia Minor and the Middle East during the 1st century AD. In modern times the percentage of Christians in Turkey has declined from 20 to 25% in 1914, to about 2% in 1927, to 0.5–0.6% today. Sources estimate that the Christian population in Turkey ranges between 403,500 and more than 570,000. However, the exact number remains unclear due to the absence of a religious census in the country. The percentage of Christians in Turkey fell mainly as a result of the late Ottoman genocides: the Armenian genocide, Greek genocide, and Assyrian genocide, the population exchange between Greece and Turkey, the emigration of Christians that began in the late 19th century and gained pace in the first quarter of the 20th century, and due to events such as the 1942 Varlık Vergisi tax levied on non-Muslim citizens in Turkey and the 1955 Istanbul pogrom against Greek and Armenian Christians. Exact numbers are difficult to estimate, as many Turkish former Muslim converts to Christianity often hide their Christian faith for fear of familial pressure, religious discrimination, and persecution.

This was due to events which had a significant impact on the country's demographic structure, such as the First World War, the anti-Christian genocides of Greeks, Armenians, and Assyrians perpetrated by Turkish Muslims, and the population exchange between Greece and Turkey, and the emigration of persecuted Christians (such as Assyrians, Greeks, Armenians, etc.) to foreign countries (mostly in Europe and the Americas) that began in the late 19th century and gained pace in the first quarter of the 20th century, especially during World War I. Signed after the First World War, the Treaty of Lausanne explicitly guarantees the security and protection of both Greek and Armenian Orthodox Christian minorities. Their religious institutions are recognized officially by the Republic of Turkey.

In 2011 according to the Pew Research Center, there were more than 200,000-370,000 people of different Christian denominations in Turkey, representing roughly 0.3-0.4 percent of Turkey's population, including an estimated 80,000 population of Oriental Orthodox Christians, 47,000 Turkish Orthodox Christians, 35,000 Roman Catholic Christians, 18,000 Antiochian Greeks, 5,000 Greek Orthodox Christians, 8,000 Protestant Christians, 4,994 Jehovah's Witnesses, and 512 Mormons. There is also a small group of ethnic Orthodox-Christian Turks (mostly living in Istanbul and İzmir) who follow the Greek Orthodox, Turkish Orthodox, or Syriac Orthodox churches, and additionally Protestant Turks who still face difficulties regarding social acceptance, and also historic claims to churches or property in the country because they are former Muslim converts to Christianity from Turkish–Muslim background, rather than ethnic minorities. Ethnically Turkish Protestants number around 7,000–8,000. In 2009, there were 236 Christian churches open for worship in Turkey. The Eastern Orthodox Church has been headquartered in Constantinople since the 4th century AD.

In 2020 the Anadolu Agency, a state-run news agency of the Turkish government, claimed that the number of Christians in Turkey was 480,854, which corresponds to 0.5% of the population. In a 2022 report of the U.S. Department of State, Christians were seen as being 0.2% of the population. The estimated number of adherents mainly refers to Armenian Orthodox Christians, Armenian Catholics, Chaldean Catholics, Eastern Catholics, Greek Orthodox Christians, Oriental Orthodox Christians, Protestants, and Syriac Orthodox Christians, as well as smaller groups. It was noted that the number of Eastern Orthodox Christians had risen sharply, mainly due to refugees from Russia and Ukraine. In 2024, Freedom House rated the country 2 out of 4 for religious freedom; this was mainly due to disputes over land. The Mor Ephrem Syriac Orthodox church, opened in October 2023, was the first church built since the foundation of the Republic of Turkey.

== Historical background ==
=== Early Christianity ===
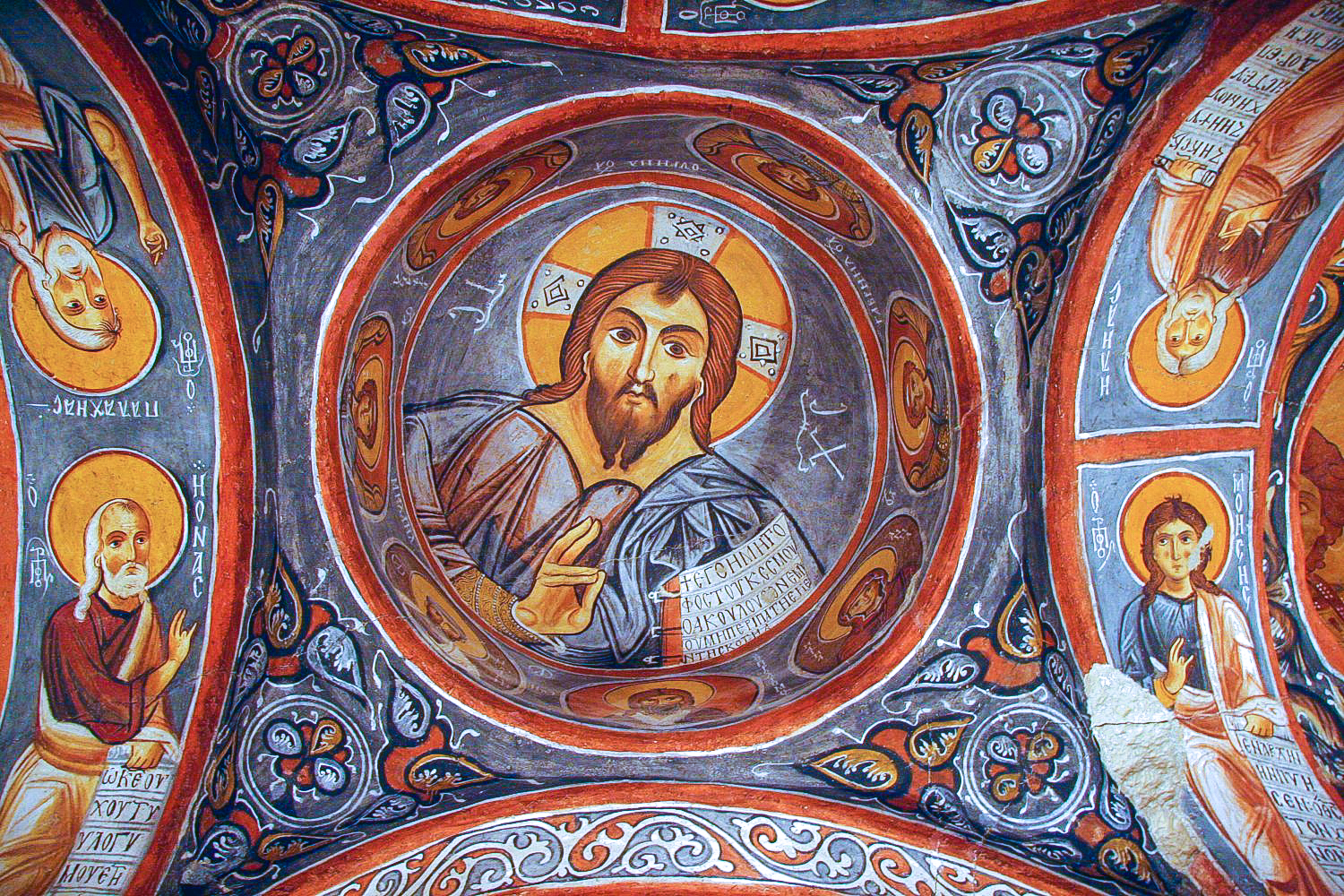
Fresco of Christ Pantocrator on the ceiling of Karanlık Kilise (The Dark Church), Churches of Göreme. The Roman province of Cappadocia was renowned for its cave churches.

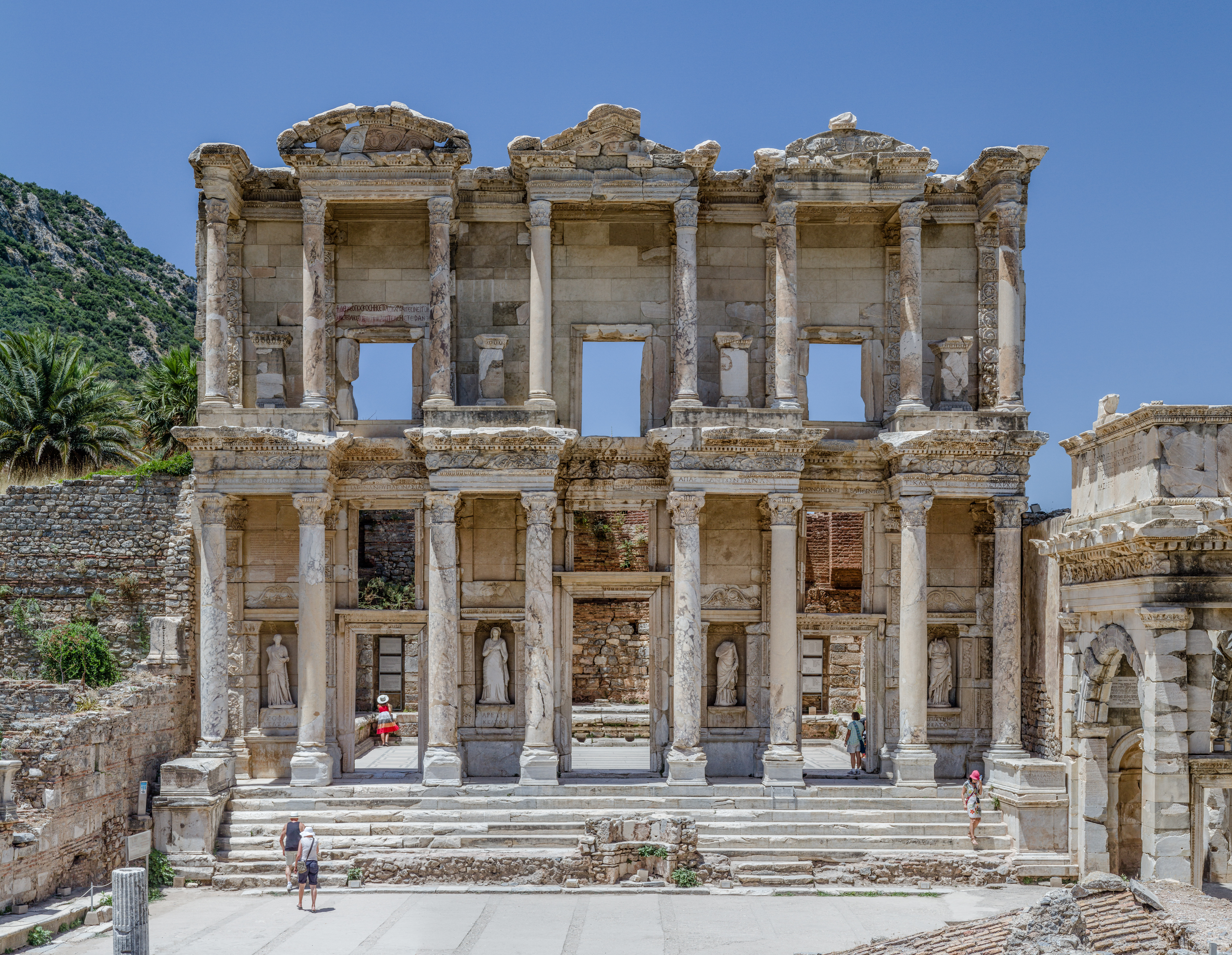
Paul the Apostle lived in Ephesus, Asia Minor. The early Christian community of Ephesus was one of the seven churches addressed in the Book of Revelation.

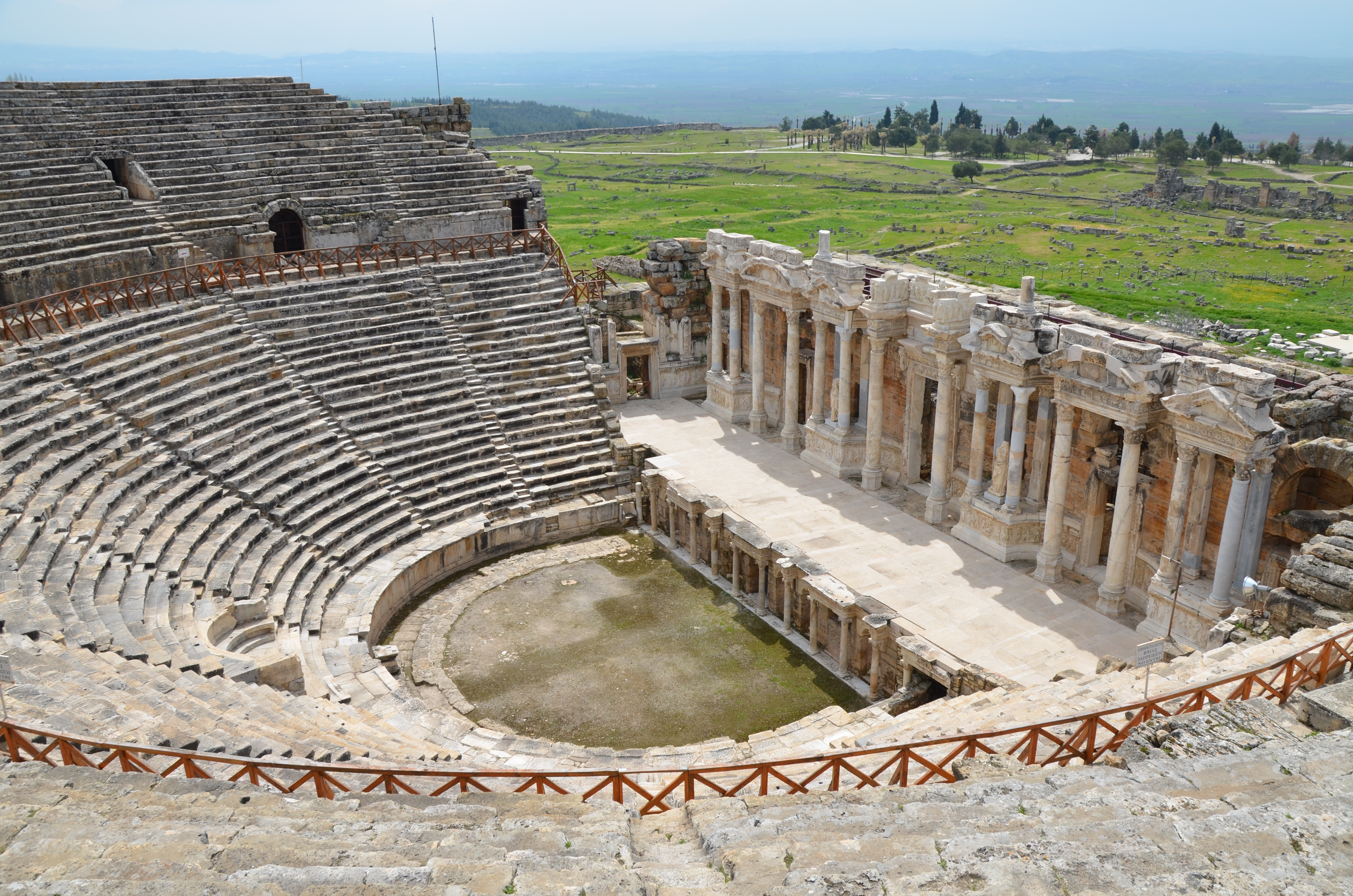
Philip the Apostle lived and was buried in Hierapolis, Turkey

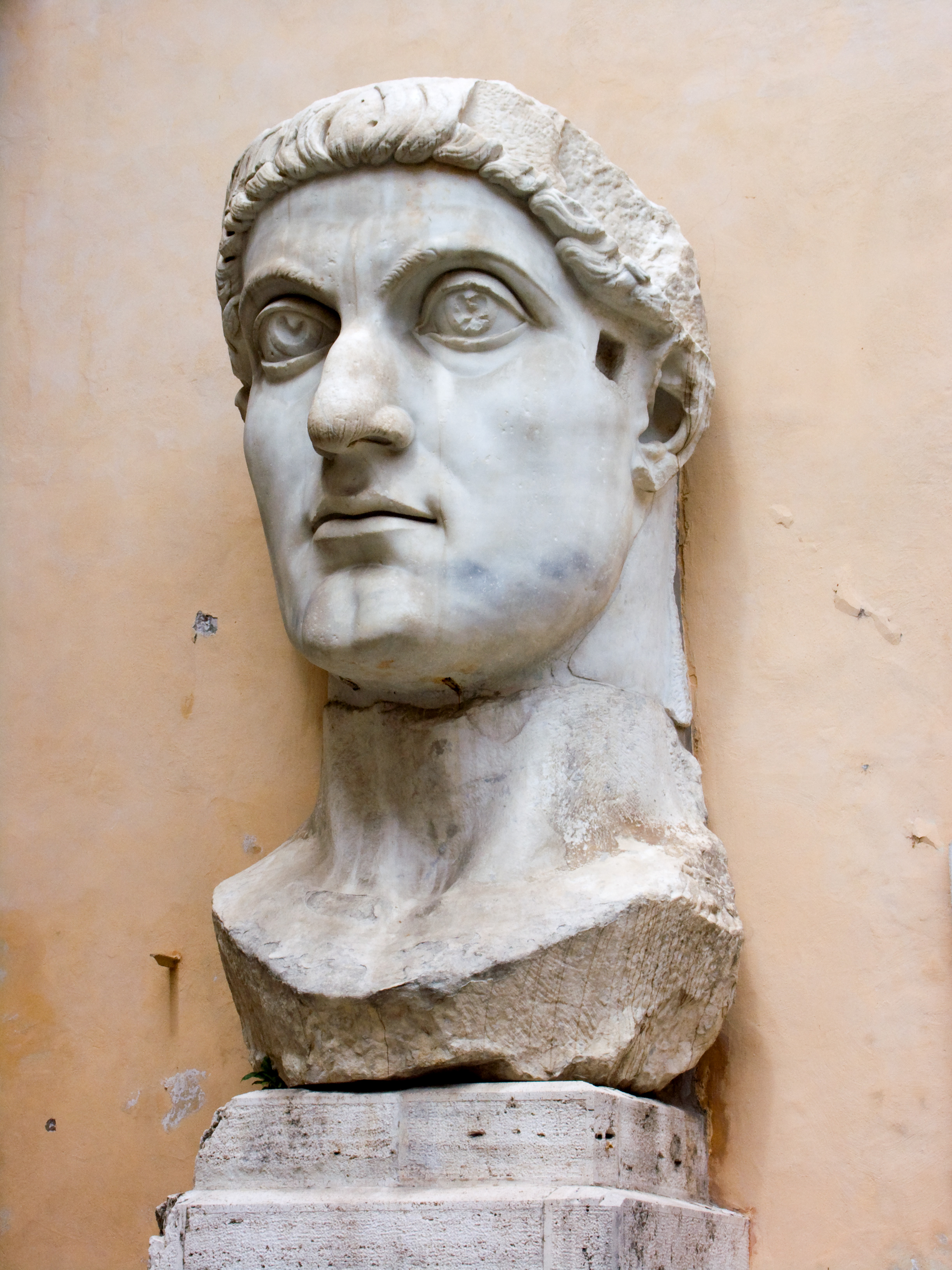
Constantine the Great, the founder of Constantinople, was the first Roman Emperor to convert to Christianity.

Hagia Sophia was built in AD 537 during the reign of Justinian I, Emperor of the Eastern Roman Empire; it was the world's largest building and an engineering marvel of its time.

The Christianization of ancient Assyrians and Armenians most likely began around the 1st century AD. The spread of Christianity beyond Jerusalem is discussed in the Book of Acts.

The Cappadocian Fathers produced some of the earliest hagiographies in the region. In addition to writings about feminine virtue by Gregory of Nyssa and Gregory of Nazianzos; later texts about Nicholas of Sion and Theodore of Sykeon described miracles and rural life.

The historical region of Syria became one of the main centers of miaphisite Christianity, embodied in the Oriental Orthodoxy, which had accepted only the first three ecumenical councils: Nicaea (325), Constantinople (381) and Ephesus (431). Miaphisite Christians were strongly opposed to Chalcedonian Creed that had been established by the Council of Chalcedon in 451. In the 5th and 6th centuries, the Syriac Orthodox Church that originated in Antioch continued to fracture into multiple denominations. Some Armenian miaphysite Christians sought to reunite with Rome in later centuries, but their efforts were unsuccessful.

Constantinople is generally considered to be the center and the "cradle of Orthodox Christian civilization". From the mid-5th century to the early 13th century, Constantinople was the largest and wealthiest city in Europe. The city became famous for its architectural masterpieces, such as Hagia Sophia, the cathedral of the Eastern Orthodox Church, which served as the seat of the Ecumenical Patriarchate, the sacred Imperial Palace where the Emperors lived, the Hippodrome, the Golden Gate of the Land Walls, and opulent aristocratic palaces. The University of Constantinople was founded in the fifth century and contained artistic and literary treasures before it was sacked in 1204 and 1453, including its vast Imperial Library which contained the remnants of the Library of Alexandria and had 100,000 volumes. The city was the home of the Ecumenical Patriarch of Constantinople and guardian of Christendom's holiest relics such as the Crown of thorns and the True Cross. During most of its existence, the Byzantine Empire was one of the most powerful economic, cultural, and military forces in Europe. The imperial role in the affairs of the Church never developed into a fixed, legally defined system. Additionally, due to the decline of Rome and internal dissension in the other Eastern Patriarchates, the Church of Constantinople became, between the 6th and 11th centuries, the richest and most influential centre of Christendom.

The Eastern Orthodox Church split from Rome during the Great Schism of 1054. With the arrival of the crusaders many Orthodox bishops, particularly in Antioch, were replaced by Latin prelates. After the Mongols defeated the Abbasid Caliphate in 1258, the Armenians and Nestorians had decent relations with the conquering Il-khans for a time, but by the end of the 14th-century many Syrian Orthodox and Nestorian churches were destroyed when the Turco-Mongolian ruler Temür raided West Asia.

Two out of the five centers (Patriarchates) of the ancient Pentarchy are in Turkey: Constantinople (Istanbul) and Antioch (Antakya). Antioch was also the place where the followers of Jesus were called "Christians" for the first time in history, as well as being the site of one of the earliest and oldest surviving churches, established by Saint Peter himself. For a thousand years, the Hagia Sophia was the largest church in the world.

Turkey is also home to the Seven Churches of Asia, where the Revelation to John was sent. Apostle John is reputed to have taken Virgin Mary to Ephesus in western Turkey, where she spent the last days of her life in a small house, known as the House of the Virgin Mary, which still survives today and has been recognized as a holy site for pilgrimage by the Catholic and Orthodox churches, as well as being a Muslim shrine. The cave of the Seven Sleepers is also located in Ephesus.

The death of the Forty Martyrs of Sebaste (modern day Sivas) is recorded as 320 AD during a persecution by Emperor Licinius. They are mentioned by Basil, Gregory of Nyssa, Ephrem the Syrian and John Chrysostom.

=== Ottoman Empire ===
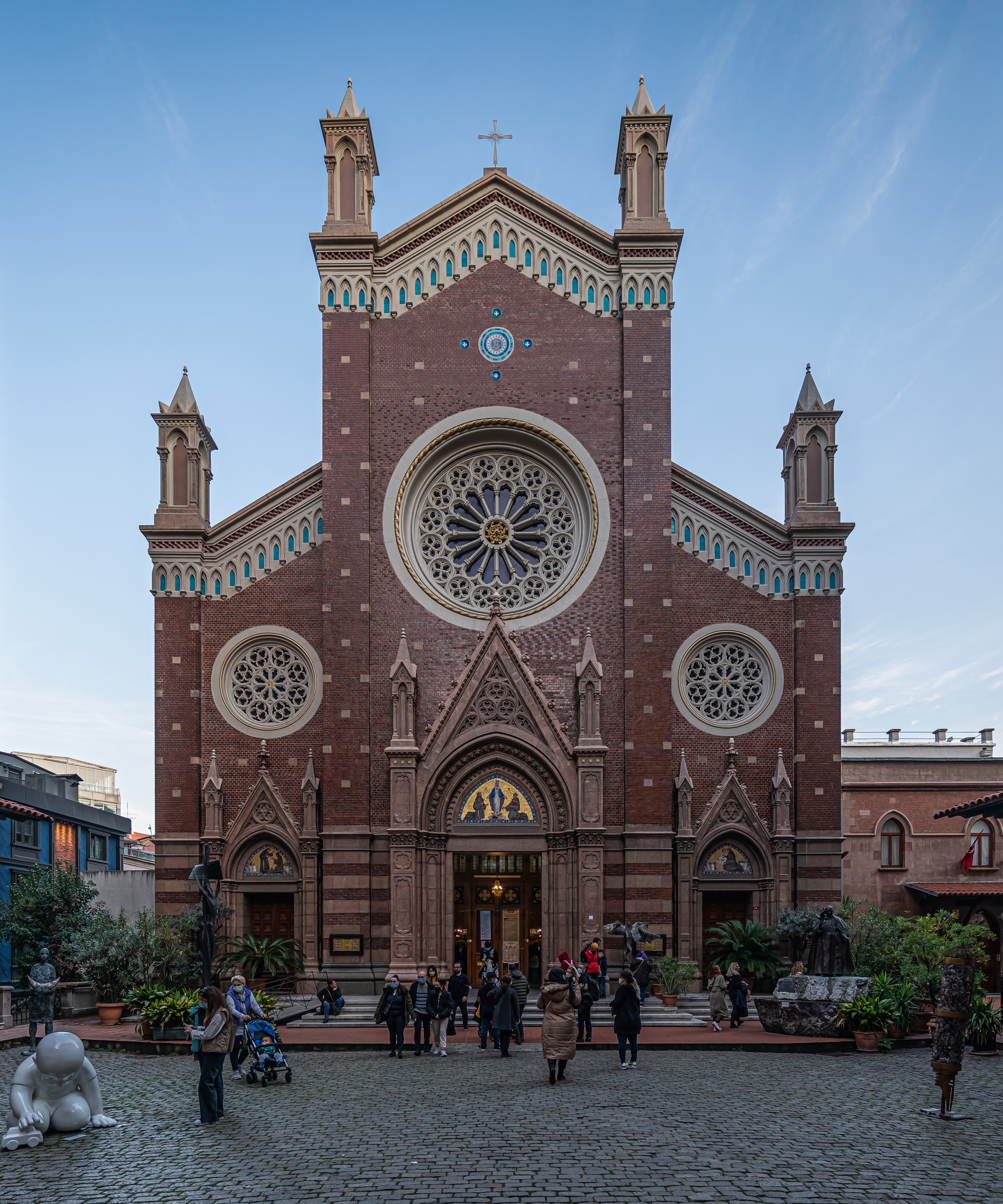
Church of St. Anthony of Padua, Istanbul built in Istanbul during Ottoman Empire.

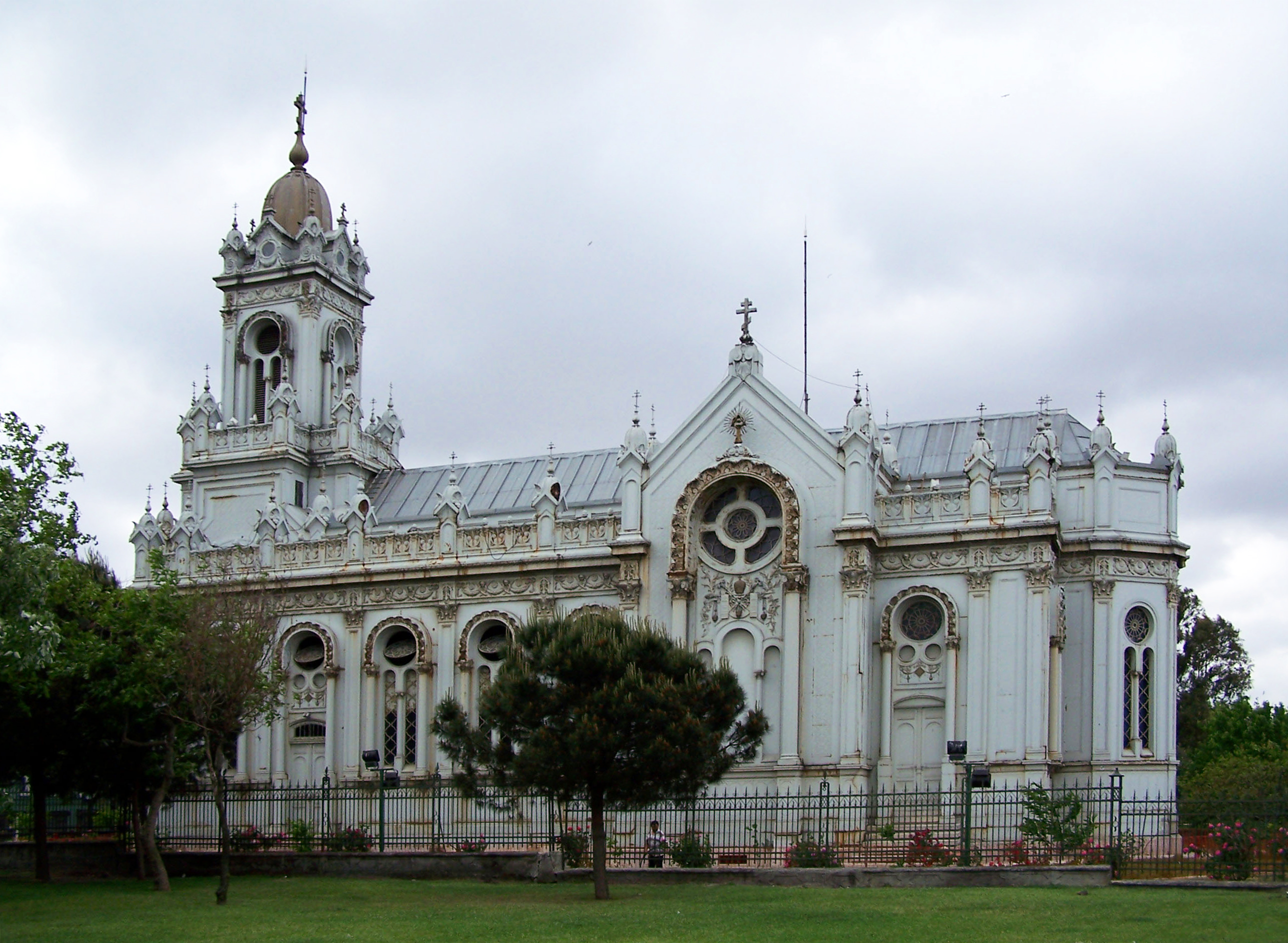
Bulgarian St. Stephen Church built in Istanbul during Ottoman Empire.

In accordance with the traditional custom of the time, the Ottoman sultan Mehmed II allowed his troops and his entourage three full days of unbridled pillage and looting in the Christian city of Constantinople, capital of the Roman Empire since its foundation by the Roman Emperor Constantine the Great in the 4th century AD, shortly after it was captured in 1453. Once the three days passed, he would then claim its remaining contents for himself. However, by the end of the first day, he proclaimed that the looting should cease as he felt profound sadness when he toured the looted and enslaved city. The cathedral of Hagia Sophia was not exempted from the pillage and looting and specifically became its focal point, as the Ottoman Turks believed it to contain the greatest treasures and valuables of the city. Shortly after the defence of the Walls of Constantinople, the city collapsed and the Ottoman troops entered victoriously; the pillagers and looters made their way to the Hagia Sophia and battered down its doors before storming in.

Throughout the period of the siege of Constantinople, the trapped Christian worshippers of the city participated in the Divine Liturgy and the Prayer of the Hours at the Hagia Sophia and the church formed a safe-haven and a refuge for many of those who were unable to contribute to the city's defence, which comprised women, children, elderly, the sick, and the wounded. Being trapped in the church, the many congregants and yet more refugees inside became spoils-of-war to be divided amongst the Ottoman invaders. The building was desecrated and looted, with the helpless occupants who sought shelter within the church being enslaved. While most of the elderly, the infirm/wounded, and sick were killed, and the remainder (mainly teenage males and young boys) were chained up and sold into slavery.

The women of Constantinople also suffered from rape and sexual violence at the hands of Ottoman forces. According to historian Barbaro, "all through the day the Turks made a great slaughter of Christians through the city". According to historian Philip Mansel, widespread persecution of the city's civilian inhabitants took place, resulting in thousands of murders and rapes, and 30,000 civilians being enslaved or forcibly deported. George Sphrantzes says that people of both sexes were raped inside the church of Hagia Sophia.

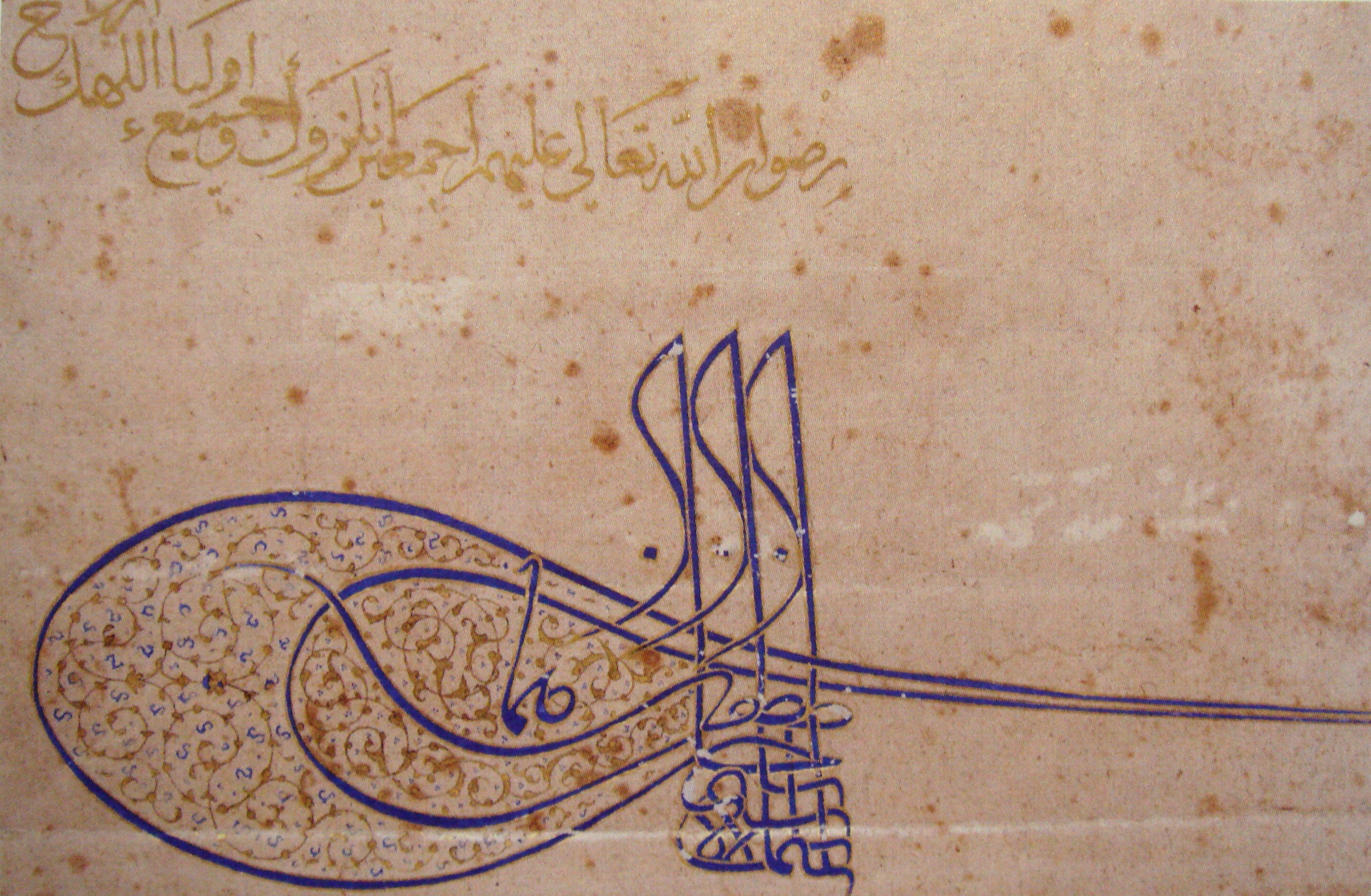
Letter of Suleiman the Magnificent to Francis I of France regarding the protection of Christians in his states. September 1528. Archives Nationales, Paris, France.

The first capitulation concluded between the Ottoman Empire and a foreign state was that of 1535, granted to the Kingdom of France. The Ottoman Empire was then at the height its power, and the French king Francis I had shortly before sustained a disastrous defeat at the Battle of Pavia. His only hope of assistance lay in the Ottoman sultan Suleiman I. The appeal to Suleiman on the ground of the common interest of the Kingdom of France and the Ottoman Empire in overcoming the power of the Holy Roman Emperor Charles V overweening power was successful; thus was established the Franco-Ottoman alliance, and in 1536 the capitulations were signed. They amounted to a treaty of commerce and a treaty allowing the establishment of Christian Frenchmen in Ottoman Turkey and fixing the jurisdiction to be exercised over them: individual and religious liberty was guaranteed to them, the King of France was empowered to appoint consuls in Ottoman Turkey, the consuls were recognized as competent to judge the civil and criminal affairs of French subjects in Ottoman Turkey according to French law, and the consuls may appeal to the officers of the sultan for their aid in the execution of their sentences. This, the first of the capitulations, can be seen as the prototype of its successors.

Anglican, American Presbyterian, and German Lutheran missionaries arrived in the Ottoman Empire in the 19th century. During the same period, there were nationalistic campaigns against Assyrians which often had the assistance of Kurdish paramilitary support. In 1915, Turks and Kurds massacred tens of thousands Assyrians in Siirt. Assyrians were attacked in the Hakkari mountains by the Turkish army with the help of Kurdish tribes, and many Christians were deported and about a quarter million Assyrians were murdered or died due to persecution. This number doubles if the killings during the 1890s are included. Kurds saw the Assyrians as dangerous foreigners and enforcers of the British colonizers, which made it justifiable to them to commit ethnic cleansing. The Kurds fought the Assyrians also due to fears that the Armenians, or European colonial powers backing them, would assume control in Anatolia. Kurdish military plundered Armenian and other Christian villages.

In the 1890s the Hamidiye (Kurdish paramilitary units) attacked Armenians in a series of clashes that culminated in the Hamidian massacres of 1894-1896 and the Adana massacre in 1909. It is estimated that between 80,000 and 300,000 Armenians were killed during these pre-War massacres. Into the 19th century, the Christians of Istanbul tended to be either Greek Orthodox, members of the Armenian Apostolic Church or Catholic Levantines.

=== First World War ===
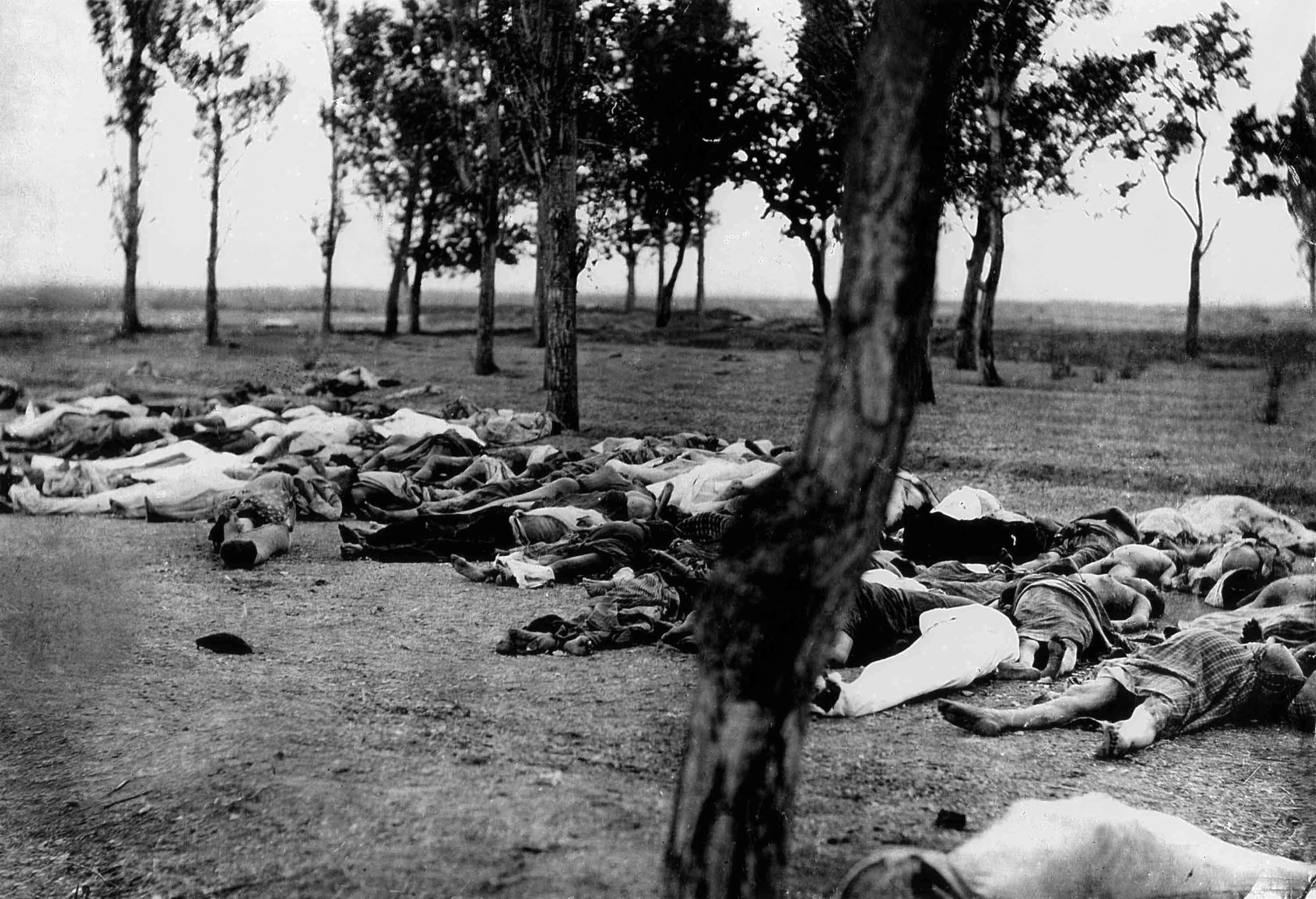
Of this photo, the U.S. ambassador Henry Morgenthau, Sr. wrote, "Scenes like this were common all over the Armenian provinces, in the spring and summer months of 1915. Death in its several forms—massacre, starvation, exhaustion—destroyed the larger part of the refugees. The Turkish policy was that of extermination under the guise of deportation".

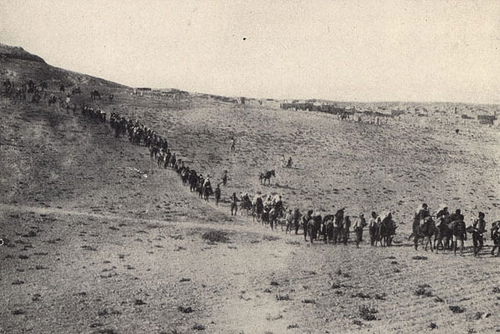
Greek Christians in 1922, fleeing their homes from Kharput to Trebizond. In the 1910s and 1920s the Armenian, Greek, and Assyrian genocides were perpetrated by the Ottoman Empire and its successor state, the Republic of Turkey.

During the tumultuous period of the First World War, up to 3 million indigenous Christians are alleged to have been killed. Prior to this time, the Christian population stood at around 20% -25% of the total. According to professor Martin van Bruinessen, relations between Christians and Kurdish and other Muslim peoples were often bitter and during World War I "Christians of Tur Abdin (in Turkey) for instance have been subjected to brutal treatment by Kurdish tribes, who took their land and even their daughters".

Kurdish-dominated Hamidiye slaughtered Christian Armenians in Tur Abdin region in 1915. It is estimated that ten thousand Assyrians were killed, and reportedly "the skulls of small children were smashed with rocks, the bodies of girls and women who resisted rape were chopped into pieces live, men were mostly beheaded, and the clergy skinned or burnt alive...." In 1915, Turks and Kurds plundered the Assyrian village of Mar-Zaya in Jelu and slaughtered the population, it is estimated that 7,000 Assyrians were slaughtered during this period. In September 1914 more than 30 Armenian and Assyrian villages were burnt by Kurdish and Turkish mobs in the Urmia region. After the Russian army retreated, Turkish troops with Kurdish detachments organized mass slaughters of Assyrians, in the Assyrian village of Haftvan 750 men were beheaded and 5,000 Assyrian women were taken to Kurdish harems. Turks and Kurds also slaughtered Christians in Diarbekir. There was a policy during the Hamidian era to use Kurdish tribes as irregulars (Hamidiye units) against the Armenians.

=== Treaty of Lausanne ===
The Greek forces who occupied Smyrna in the post-war period were defeated in the Turkish War of Independence which ended with the signing of the Treaty of Lausanne. Under the terms of the peace treaty, 1.3 million Christian residents of Turkey were relocated to Greece and around 400,000 Muslims were likewise moved from Greece to Turkey. When the Turkish state was founded in 1923, the remaining Greek population was estimated to be around 111,000; the Greek Orthodox communities in Istanbul, Gökçeada, and Bozcaada numbering 270,000 were exempted. Other terms of the treaty included various provisions to protect the rights of religious minorities and a concession by the Turks to allow the Greek Orthodox Patriarchate to remain in Istanbul.

== Republic of Turkey (1923–present) ==
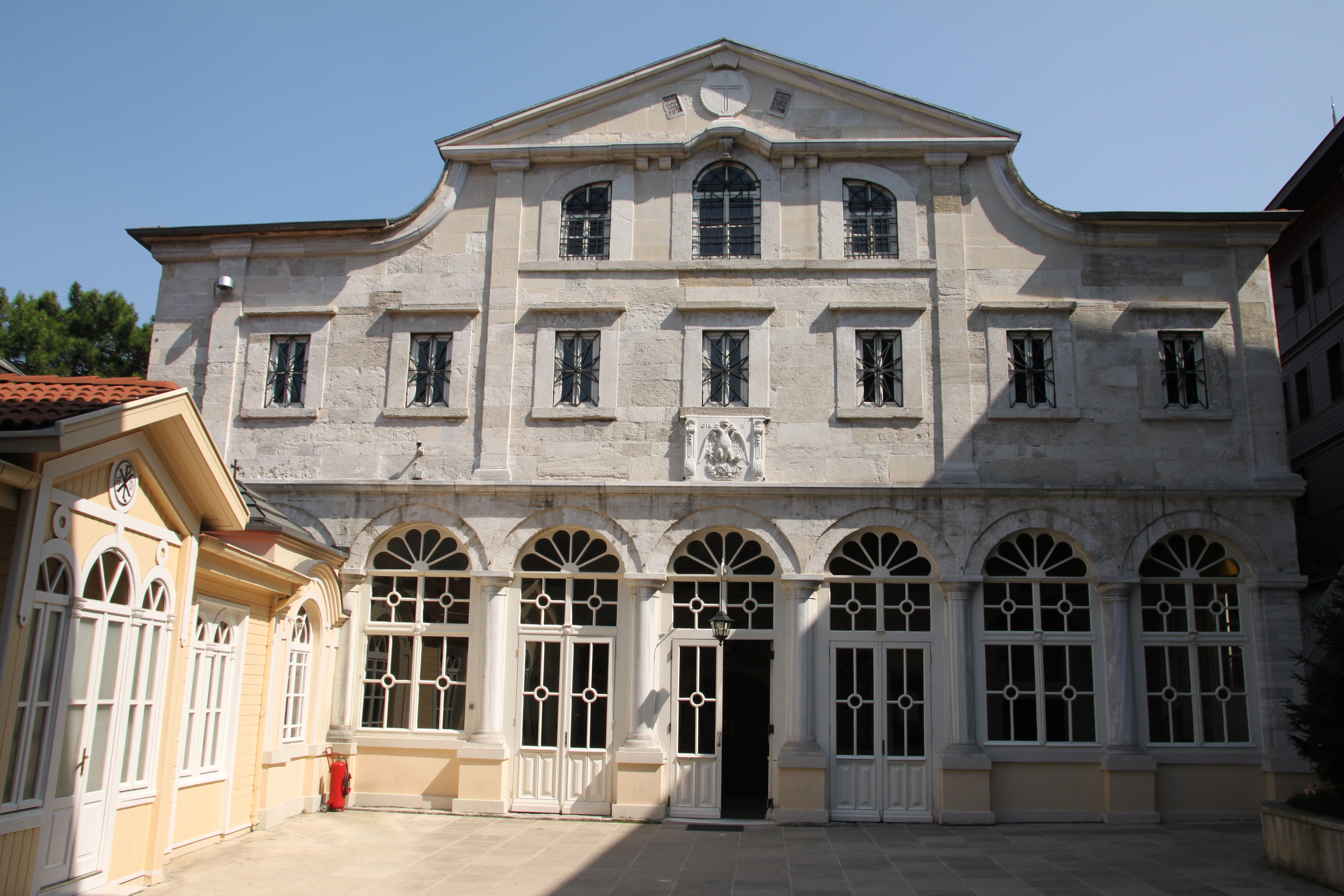
St. George's Cathedral is the epicenter of the Eastern Orthodox Church and Ecumenical Patriarchate of Constantinople, home to the spiritual leader of 300 million Eastern Orthodox Christians worldwide.

The British Broadcasting Corporation (BBC) reported in 2014 that the Christian population of Turkey had declined from 20% to 0.2% since 1914.

The U.S. Commission on International Religious Freedom (USCIRF) designated Turkey a "Country of Particular Concern" for religious freedom, noting "systematic limitations on the freedom of religion or belief" with respect to access to places of worship, religious education, and right to train clergy. The report does note some areas of improvement such as better protection of the property rights of Non-Muslims.

In the pre-war period, Protestant Christian missionaries from North America had been actively involved in the Ottoman education system. Many of the schools were closed down and suffered under stringent regulations and burdensome taxes during the secularization of Turkey. Historically, these schools had worked with the Christian communities in the Ottoman Empire, and were regarded with suspicion by the fledgling republic.

In 2001, Turkey's National Security Council (MGK) reported that it considers Protestant Christian missionaries the third largest threat to Turkey's national security, surpassed only by Islamic fundamentalism and the Kurdish separatist organization Kurdistan Workers' Party (PKK). A 2004 report by the Turkish Armed Forces (TAF) similarly recommended implementing new laws to curb Christian missionary activities in the country. According to the Turkish Evangelical Churches movement, Turkish Protestant churches had only 3,000 members in 2009—about half of these were former Muslim converts to Christianity, while the others were Christian converts from Armenian Orthodox and Syriac Christian churches. Since Turkish nationality was often perceived exclusively as a Muslim identity after the Balkan Wars, the influence of Protestant Christian missionaries on Turkey's Alevi population has been a concern since the era of Committee of Union and Progress rule. In 2016, the Association of Protestant Churches in Turkey released a report warning of an increase in anti-Christian hate speech.

Historically, the Christian population of Turkey has been largely peaceful and non-disruptive, with the notable exception of one former Muslim convert to Christianity who hijacked the Turkish Airlines Flight 1476 in 2006 with the stated intent of flying it to the Vatican to meet the Pope and ask for his help to avoid serving in the Turkish Armed Forces, which he referred to as a "Muslim army".

In 2013, the Washington Post reported that members of the ruling Justice and Development Party had expressed their desires to convert Hagia Sophia into a mosque. Hagia Sophia, which is called ayasofya in Turkish, is an ancient Christian church dating to 360 AD that was converted into a mosque after Mehmed II invaded Constantinople in 1453. It has been a museum since 1935. Patriarch Bartholomew objected to the government's rhetoric, saying "If it is to reopen as a house of worship, then it should open as a Christian church." Also in 2013, the government announced that the 5th-century Monastery of Stoudios, located in Istanbul's Samatya neighborhood, would be converted into a mosque. The monastery, one of Byzantium's most important, was sacked during the Crusades and later served as a mosque for a time, until it was converted to a museum during the 20th century.

Today, the Christian population of Turkey is estimated at 203,500–370,000 Christians. 35,000 Catholics of varying ethnicities, 25,000 ethnic "Assyrians" (Turkish: Süryaniler), (mostly followers of the Syriac Orthodox Church, Syriac Catholic Church, the Church of the East, and the Chaldean Catholic Church), 3,000–4,000 Greek Orthodox, 15,000–18,000 Antiochian Greeks and smaller numbers of Bulgarians, Georgians, and Protestant Christians of various ethnicities. Moreover, there is an ethnic Turkish Protestant Christian community in Turkey which number about 7,000–8,000 adherents; most of these Christian converts are from Turkish–Muslim background. In 2003, the mainstream Turkish newspaper Milliyet reported that 35,000 Turkish former Muslims had converted to Christianity. According to Bekir Bozdağ, Deputy Prime Minister of Turkey, there were 349 active churches in Turkey in October 2012: 140 Greek, 58 Assyrian, and 52 Armenian. In 2015, the Turkish government gave permission for the Christian channel SAT-7 to broadcast on the government-regulated Türksat satellite.

Since the establishment of the modern Republic of Turkey in 1923, a number of high-profile incidents targeting Non-Muslims, including Christians, have occurred. This includes the Istanbul pogrom of 1955, where non-Muslims were attacked and killed, as well as more recent attacks, such as the assassination of prominent Turkish–Armenian journalist Hrant Dink in 2007, the torture and murder of one German Protestant and two Turkish converts to Christianity in what Turkish media dubbed "the missionary massacres" in the same year, and the killings of Italian Catholic priests, including Andrea Santoro, in 2006 and 2007. In January 2024, two gunmen fatally shot a man during a church service in Istanbul in an attack claimed by the Islamic State (Daesh).

== Christian communities ==
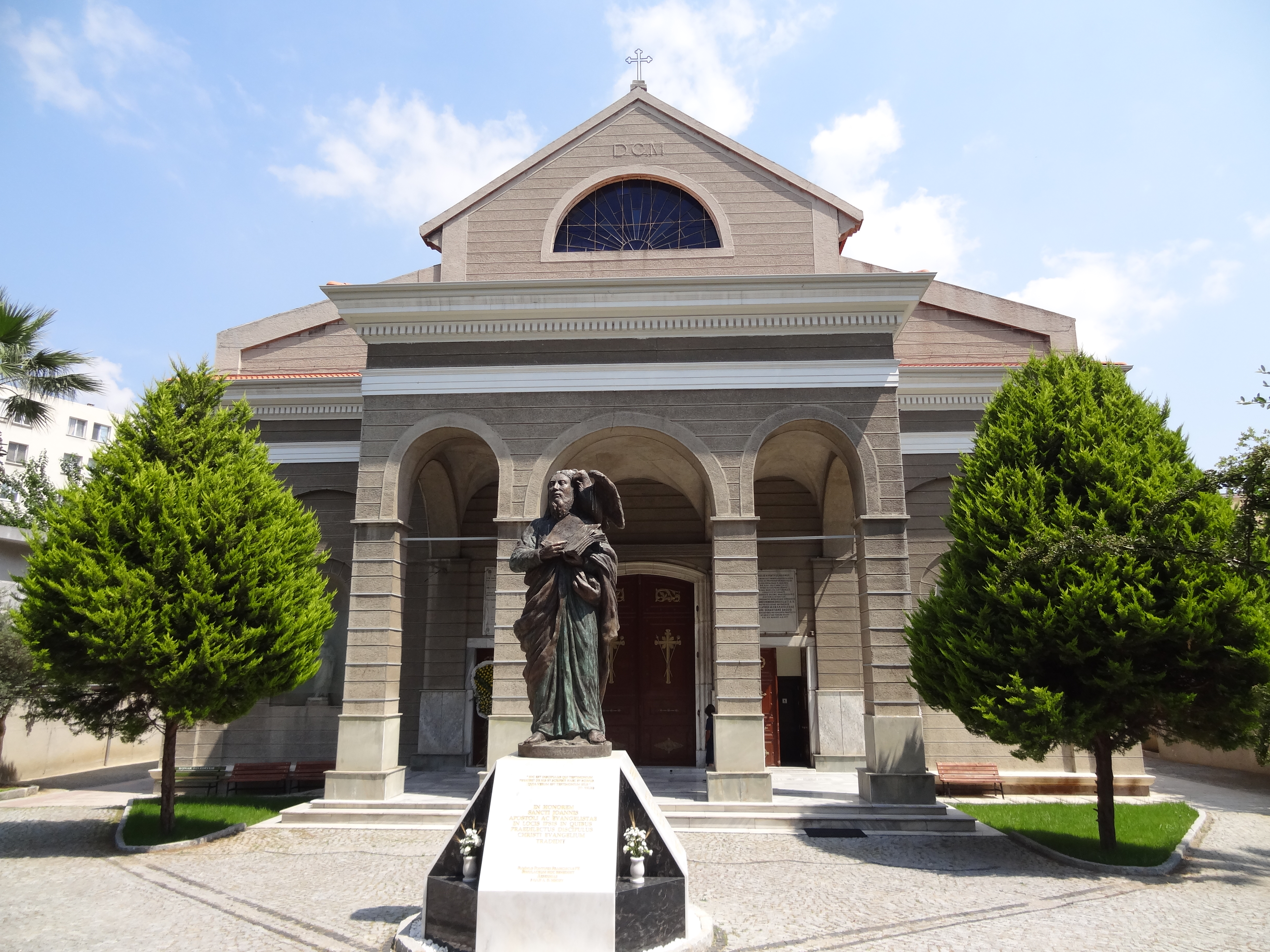
St. John's Cathedral is dedicated to John the Evangelist, who in the Book of Revelation sent greetings and instructions to the Seven churches of Asia, including that of Smyrna.

The largest Christian population in Turkey is located in Istanbul, which has a large community of Armenians and Greeks. Istanbul is also where the Patriarchate of Greek Orthodox Christianity is located. Antioch, located in Turkey's Hatay province, is the original seat of the namesake Antiochian Orthodox Church, but is now the titular see. The area, known for having ethnic diversity and large Christian community, has 7,000 Christians and 14 active churches. The city has one of the oldest churches in the world as well, called the Church of St Peter, which is said to have been founded by the Saint himself.

The Syriac Orthodox Church has a strong presence in Mardin; many Assyrian Christians left during the late Ottoman genocides in 1915. Tur Abdin is a large area with a multitude of mostly Syriac Orthodox churches, monasteries, and ruins. Settlements in Tur Abdin include Midyat. The Christian community in Midyat is supplemented by a refugee community from Syria and has four operating churches. Some of the most significant Syriac churches and monasteries in existence are in or near Midyat including Mor Gabriel Monastery and the Saffron Monastery.

By the 21st century, Greek Orthodox Christians in Turkey had declined to only around 2,000–3,000. There are between 40,000 and 70,000 Armenian Orthodox Christians in Turkey. By some estimates, in the early 2000s there were between 10,000 and 20,000 Catholics and Protestants in Turkey. Since the 1960s, a growing number of Turkish former Muslims are converting to Christianity; estimates range from 4,000 to 35,000 by various sources.

Martin Kmetec, a Conventual Franciscan friar and current Archbishop of İzmir, stated in an interview with Aid to the Church in Need that ecumenical relations between Christians are generally good in the country: "In general, our relations with other Christian churches are good. The Ecumenical Patriarch of Constantinople, Bartholomew I, for example, has a good relationship with the Focolare Movement and the new Apostolic Vicar of Istanbul, Bishop Massimiliano Palinuro. Likewise, here in İzmir we get together with the Orthodox Christians, but also with the Anglicans, on various Christian feast days. Armenian priests recently celebrated an Armenian liturgy at our Catholic Church of St. Polycarp because they do not have their own church in İzmir. We also worked together with the Armenians in İzmir to open a small book shop for the Bible Society. These are promising signs of an ecumenical dialogue."

== Churches in Turkey ==
=== Armenian Apostolic Church ===
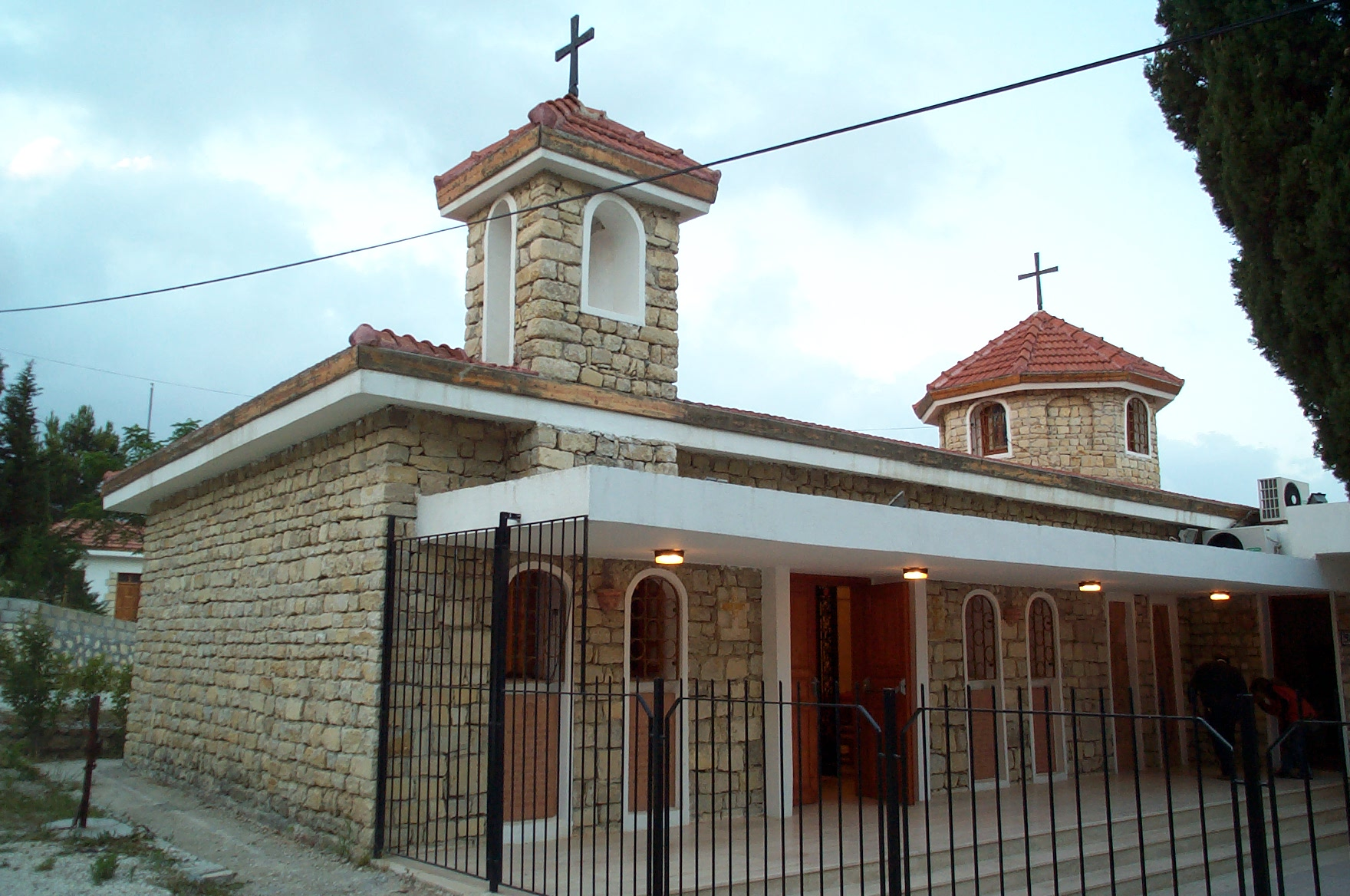
Armenian Apostolic church in Vakifli, Turkey

The Armenian Apostolic Church traces its origins to St. Gregory the Illuminator who is credited with having introduced the Armenian king Tiridates III to Christianity. It is one of the most ancient churches established in the Caucasus and Eastern Anatolia. Historically, the Armenian Church accepted only the first three Ecumenical Councils, rejecting the Council of Chalcedon in 451 AD; its Christology is sometimes described as "non-Chalcedonian" for this reason. The Bible was first translated into the Armenian language by Mesrop Mashtots. The Armenian Christian community in Turkey is led by the Armenian Patriarchates of Istanbul and Jerusalem. As of 2008 estimates of Turkey's Armenian Orthodox population range from between 50,000 and 70,000.

There are 35 churches maintained by the religious foundation in Istanbul and its surrounding areas. Besides Surp Asdvadzadzin Patriarchal Church (translation: the Holy Mother-of-God Armenian Patriarchal Church) in Kumkapi, Istanbul, there are tens of Armenian Apostolic churches. There are other churches in Kayseri, Diyarbakır, Derik, İskenderun, and Vakifli Koyu that are claimed by foundations as well. Around 1,000 Armenian churches throughout Turkey sit on public or privately owned land as well, with them all either being re-purposed or abandoned and/or in ruins.

- Armenian Catholic Church - There are several Armenian Catholic churches in Istanbul, including a large cemetery. In Mardin one remains as a Museum and occasional religious center.
- Armenian Evangelical Church - The Armenian Protestants have three churches in Istanbul from the 19th century.

=== Autocephalous Turkish Orthodox Patriarchate ===
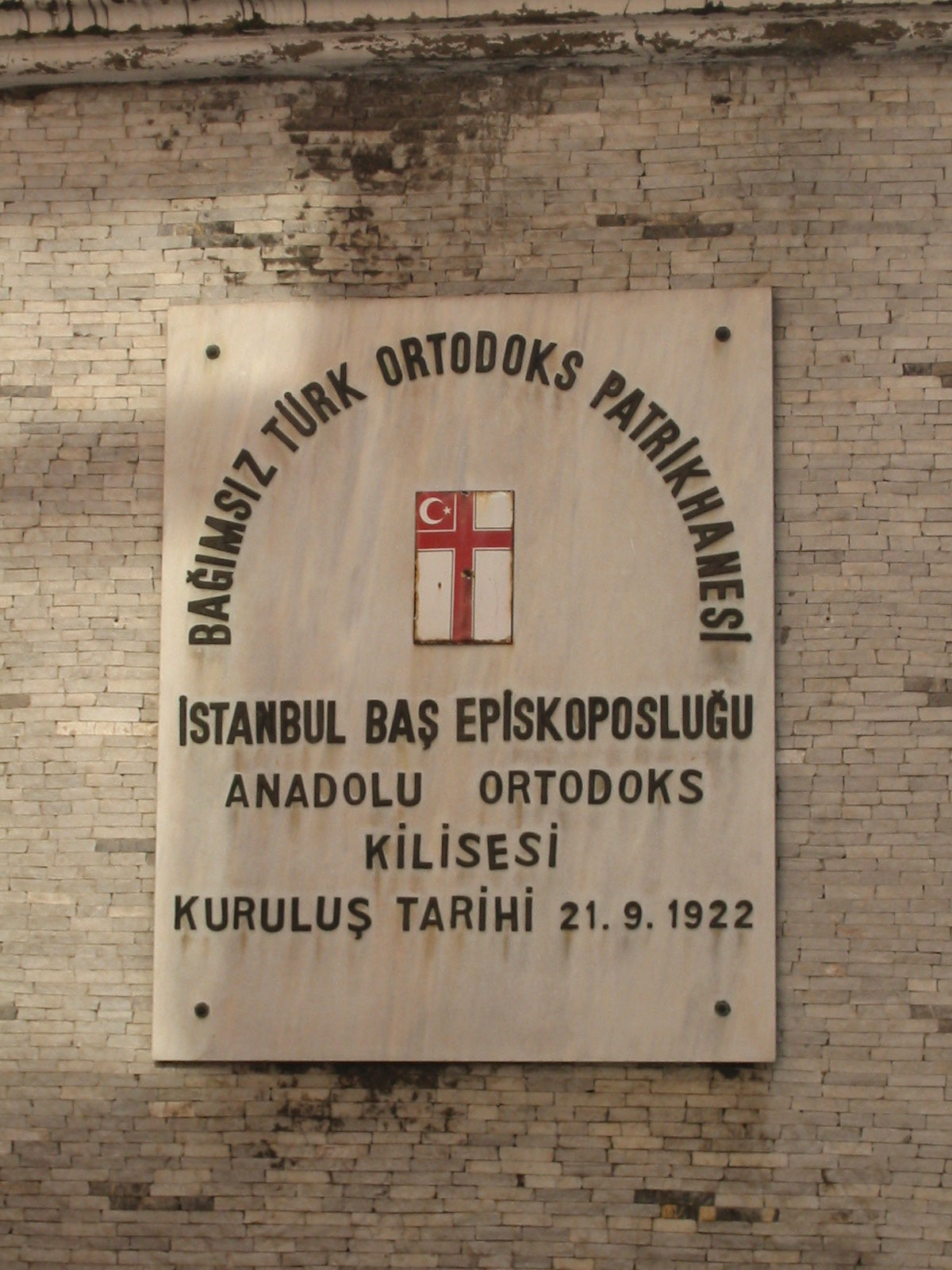
Official insignia of the Autocephalous Turkish Orthodox Patriarchate

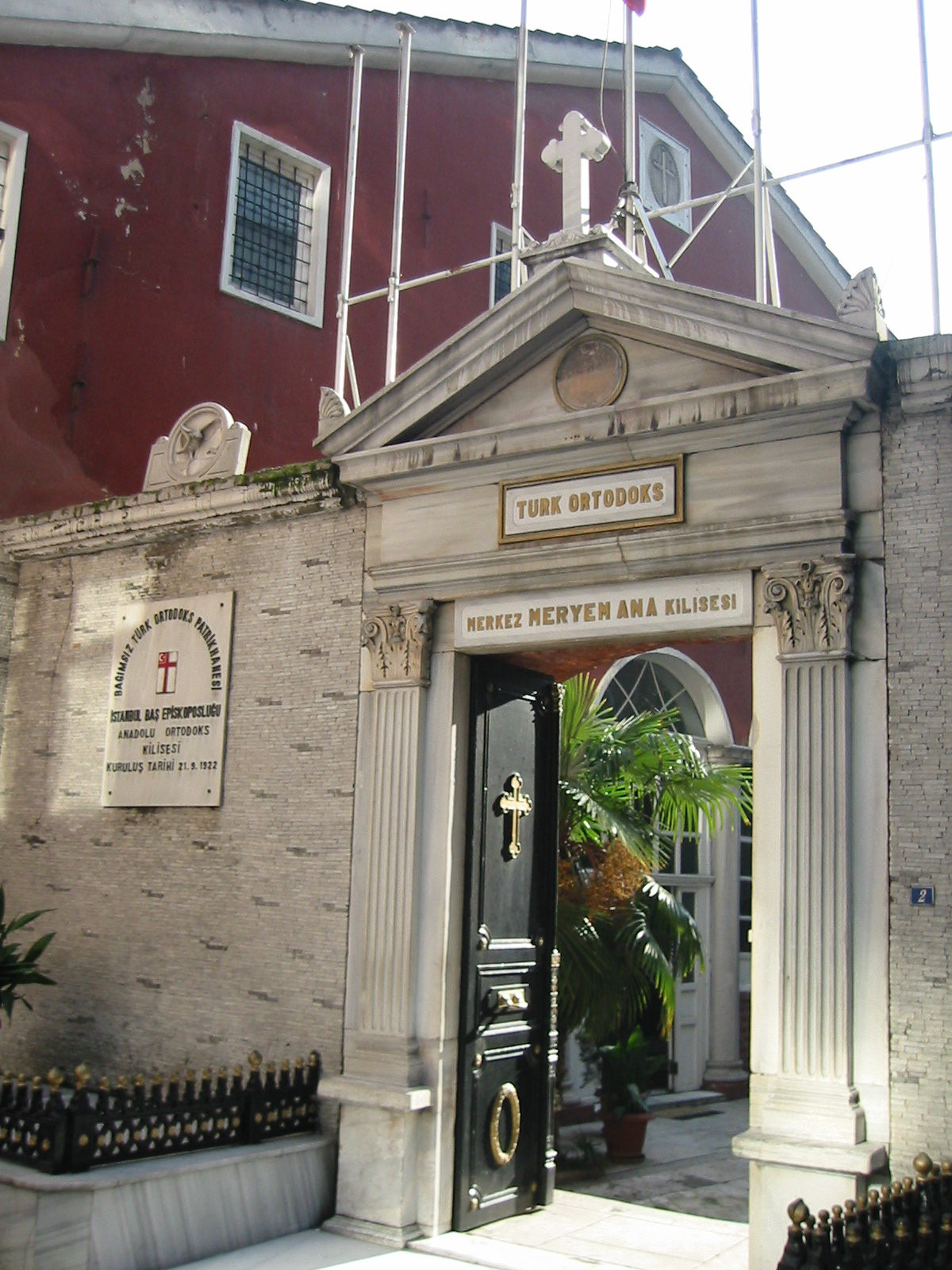
Meryem Ana (Virgin Mary) Orthodox Church of the Autocephalous Turkish Orthodox Patriarchate in Galata, Istanbul

The Autocephalous Turkish Orthodox Patriarchate (Turkish: Bağımsız Türk Ortodoks Patrikhanesi), also referred to as the Turkish Orthodox Church, is an unrecognized Eastern Orthodox Christian denomination based in Turkey. It was founded in Kayseri by Pavlos Karahisarithis, a supporter of the General Congregation of the Anatolian Turkish Orthodox (Turkish: Umum Anadolu Türk Ortodoksları Cemaatleri), in 1922. Pavlos Karahisarithis became the Patriarch of this new Orthodox church, and took the name of Papa Eftim I. He was supported by 72 other Turkish Orthodox clerics.

The start of the Patriarchate can be traced to the Greco-Turkish War (1919–1922). In 1922 a pro-Turkish Eastern Orthodox group, the General Congregation of the Anatolian Turkish Orthodox, was set up with the support from the Orthodox bishop of Havza, as well as a number of other congregations representing a genuine movement among the Turkish-speaking, Orthodox Christian population of Anatolia who wished to remain both Orthodox and Turkish. There were calls to establish a new Patriarchate with Turkish as the preferred language of Christian worship.

In 1924, Karahisarithis started to conduct the Christian liturgy in Turkish, and quickly won support from the establishment of the modern Republic of Turkey, formed after the defeat and dissolution of the Ottoman Empire (1908–1922). He claimed that the Ecumenical Patriarchate of Constantinople was ethnically centered and favored the Greek population. Being excommunicated by the Greek Orthodox Church for claiming to be a bishop while still having a wife and due to the fact that married bishops are not allowed in Eastern Orthodoxy, Karahisarithis, who later changed his name into Zeki Erenerol, called a Turkish ecclesiastical congress, which elected him Patriarch in 1924.

=== Greek Orthodox Church ===
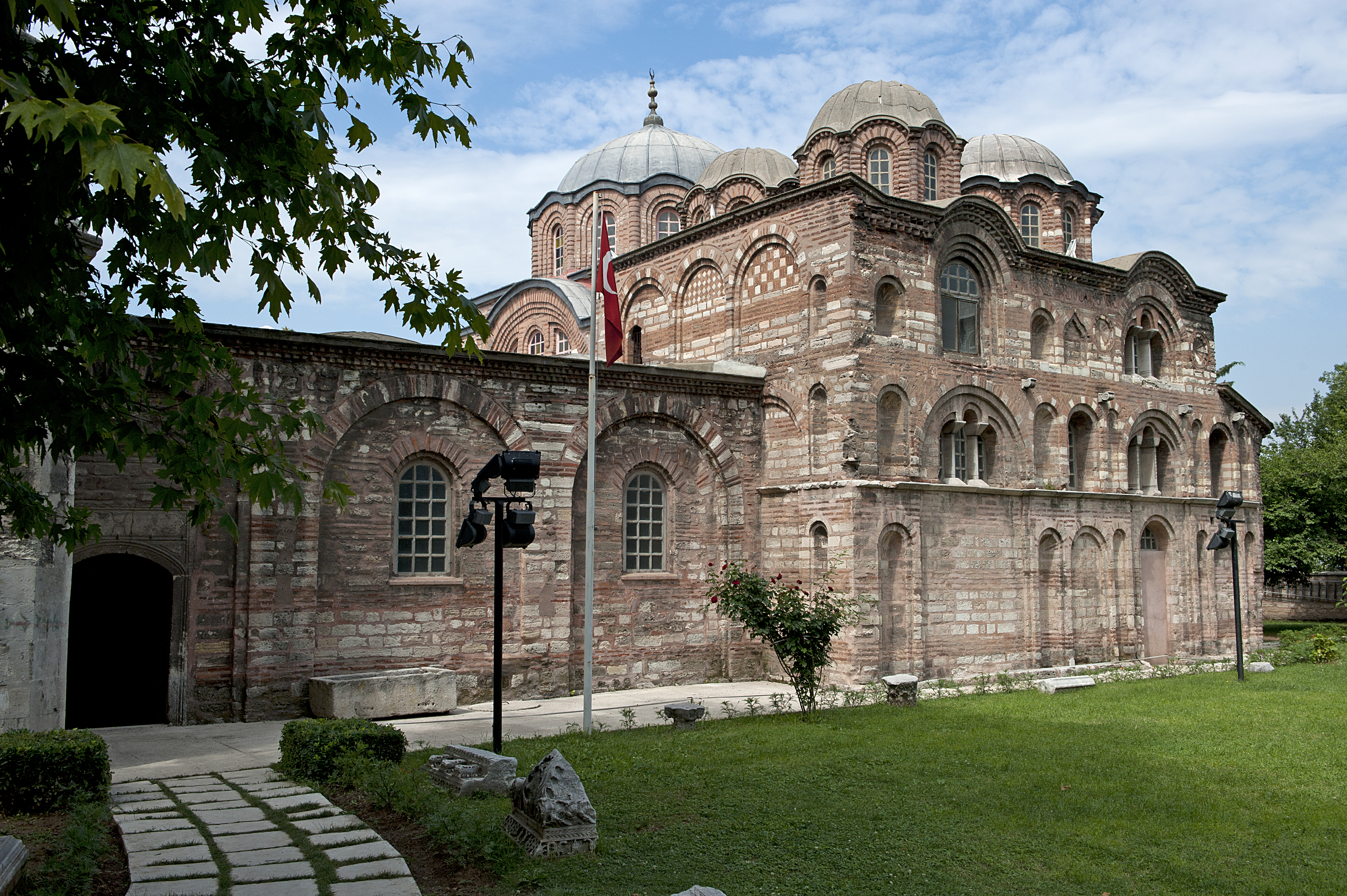
Fethiye Mosque, also known as Pammakaristos Church or the Church of Theotokos Pammakaristos (Greek: Θεοτόκος ἡ Παμμακάριστος, "All-Blessed Mother of God"), is one of the most famous Byzantine buildings and a former Greek Orthodox church in Istanbul.

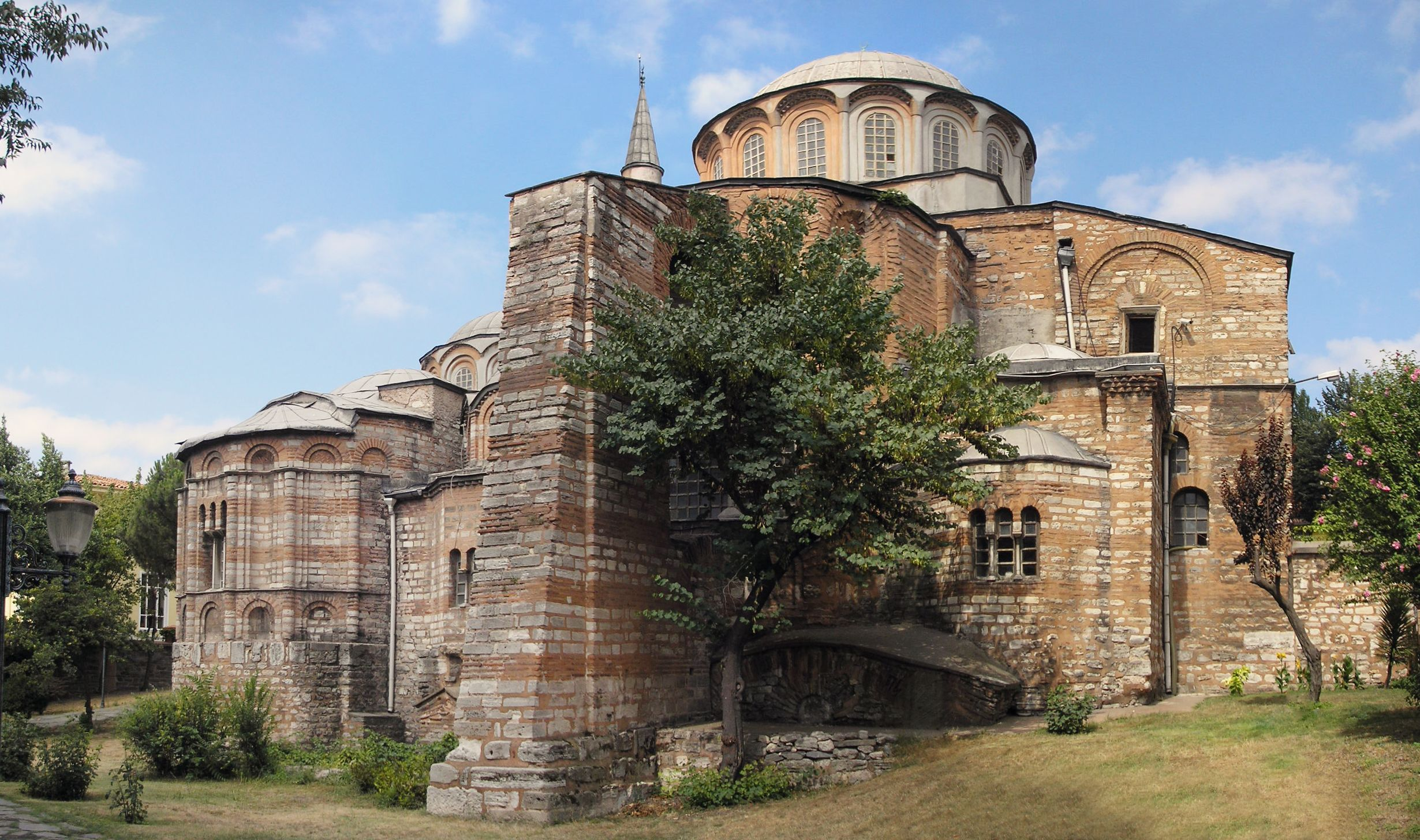
Kariye Mosque, formerly a Byzantine Greek Orthodox church known as the Chora Church, was a museum from 1945 until its reconversion into a mosque in 2020. It is located in the Edirnekapı neighborhood of Istanbul.

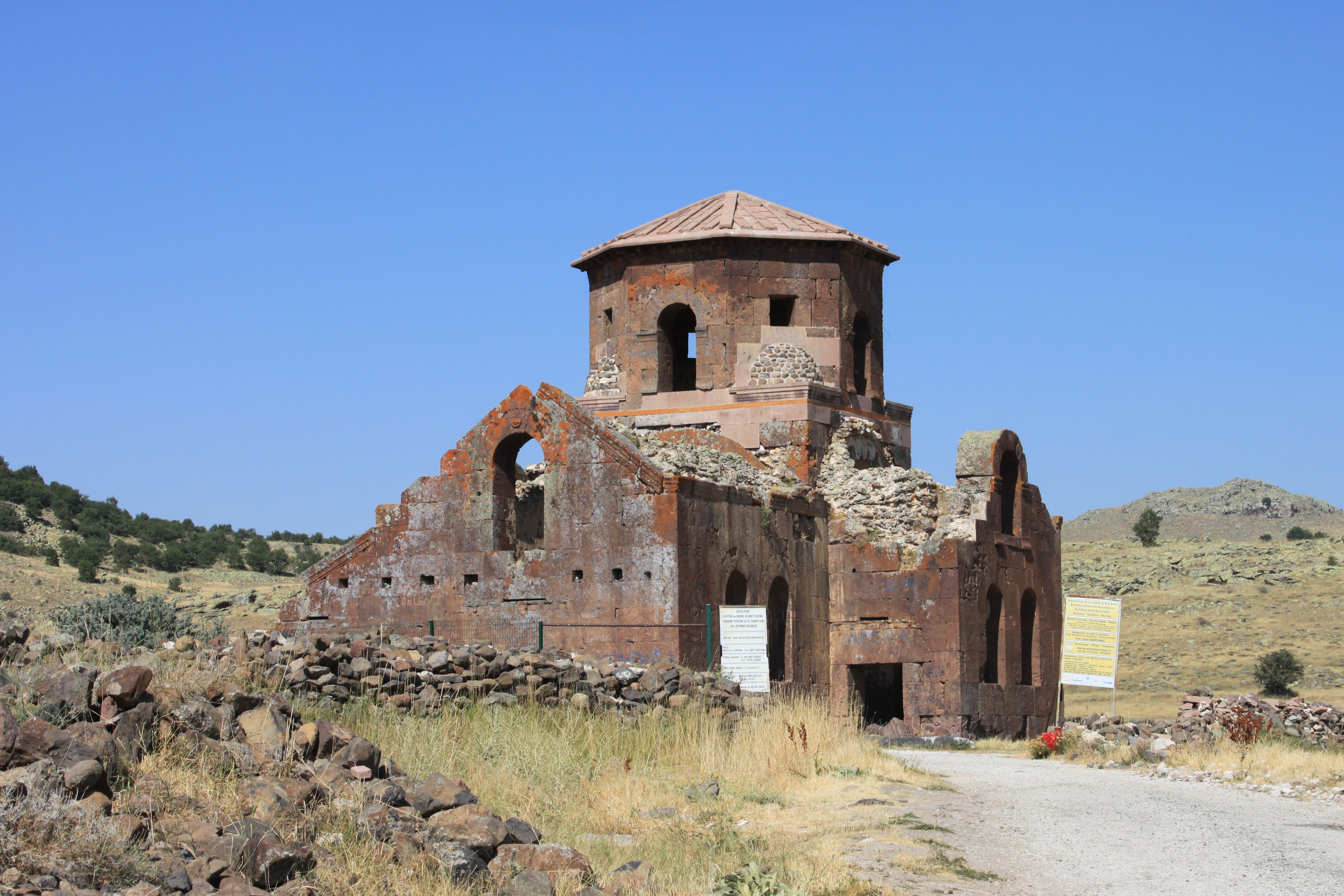
Ruins of Kızıl Kilise ("Red Church") near Güzelyurt, in Aksaray

Constantinople was dedicated as the capital of the Roman Empire in 330 AD, and served as the capital of the Eastern Roman (Byzantine) Empire from the empire's definitive division in 395 until 1453. The city's see was elevated in the ecclesiastical hierarchy by the First Council of Constantinople in 381, which decreed in its third canon that the Bishop of Constantinople should have the "prerogative of honor" after the Bishop of Rome because the city was the "New Rome". The traditional apostolic origin of the Patriarchate is traced to St. Andrew, a claim that gained prominence in later centuries. The first historically attested bishops who oversaw the see's rise to prominence were Metrophanes and Alexander of Constantinople, who held the office before and during the city's imperial refoundation.

At the Council of Chalcedon in 451, Constantinople's status was expanded. Canon 28 granted it jurisdiction over several metropolitan sees and "equal privileges" to Old Rome, a canon the papacy did not accept. Following the council's condemnation of Monophysitism, the popes in Rome and the patriarchs of Constantinople were often aligned in the ensuing theological disputes with the Patriarchate of Alexandria, a major center of Monophysite belief. The doctrine of the Pentarchy, which conceived of the universal church as governed by the five patriarchs of Rome, Constantinople, Alexandria, Antioch, and Jerusalem, was first given legal expression in the 6th-century legislation of Emperor Justinian I. This concept, which formalized the existing administrative structure of the church, was later used as an ecclesiological model in opposition to Roman claims of universal jurisdiction.

During the 8th and 9th centuries, the Byzantine Empire experienced the Iconoclastic Controversy, a prolonged theological conflict over the veneration of religious images. The 9th century also saw the Photian schism, a conflict that began with a dispute over the patriarchal see between Ignatios and Photios I but expanded to include major canonical and theological issues, including papal jurisdictional claims in the Balkans and the Western addition of the Filioque clause to the Nicene Creed.

The primary Eucharistic service of the Byzantine Rite is the Divine Liturgy. The rite also includes a cycle of daily non-Eucharistic services known as the Daily Office or Horologion, analogous to the Divine Office in the Latin Rite. The Byzantine Rite is used for the administration of the Holy Mysteries (sacraments), which include Baptism, Chrismation, Holy Communion (the Eucharist, understood as the most direct union with Christ), confession, unction, matrimony, and ordination. Other rites, such as blessings and exorcisms, are also performed. The two primary Eucharistic liturgies are the Divine Liturgy of St. John Chrysostom and the Divine Liturgy of St. Basil the Great, so named because their central anaphoras are attributed to these saints. A third service, the Liturgy of the Presanctified Gifts, is a vesperal service celebrated on weekdays during Great Lent; it is not a full Divine Liturgy as it lacks an anaphora and distributes communion from elements consecrated at a previous liturgy.

=== Catholic Church ===
The Catholic Church in Turkey is composed of jurisdictions of the Latin, Armenian, Chaldean, and Byzantine rites. The schism between the Armenian Apostolic Church and the churches of Rome and Byzantium developed gradually after the Council of Chalcedon in 451 AD over Christological disputes, with the separation being formalized in the 6th century. Over subsequent centuries, a number of Armenian Christians entered into communion with the Catholic Church, forming the Armenian Catholic Church. In 1829, Sultan Mahmud II formally recognized the Armenian Catholics as a distinct millet, granting them civil and legal autonomy from the Armenian Apostolic Patriarchate. This act allowed for the establishment of a separate ecclesiastical administration in Constantinople, which officially became the see of the Armenian Catholic Patriarchate in 1866.

- Latin rite:
  - Vicariate Apostolic of Istanbul, with seat in the Cathedral of the Holy Spirit, Istanbul. Basilica: St. Anthony of Padua Church in Istanbul, Istanbul. Jurisdiction: Immediately subjected to the Holy See
  - Vicariate Apostolic of Anatolia, with seat in the Cathedral of the Annunciation, İskenderun, and Co-Cathedral of St. Anthony of Padua, Mersin. Jurisdiction: Immediately subjected to the Holy See
  - Roman Catholic Archdiocese of İzmir, with seat in the St. John's Cathedral, İzmir.
- Armenian rite: Armenian Catholic Archdiocese of Istanbul. Cathedral: Holy Mother of God Armenian Cathedral Church, Istanbul. Jurisdiction: Immediately subjected to the Holy See.
- Byzantine Rite: Greek Catholic Apostolic Exarchate of Istanbul. Cathedral: Holy Trinity Greek Catholic Cathedral, Istanbul (Ayatriada Rum Katoliki Kilise). Jurisdiction: Immediately subjected to the Holy See.
- Syriac Rite: Syrian Catholic Patriarchal Exarchate of Turkey, with seat in Istanbul. Jurisdiction: Subject to the Syriac Catholic Church.
- Chaldaean Rite: Chaldean Catholic Archdiocese of Diarbekir. Cathedral: St. Mary's Cathedral, Diyarbakır, but with seat in Beyoğlu, Istanbul. Jurisdiction: Chaldean Catholic Church.

=== Syriac Orthodox Church ===
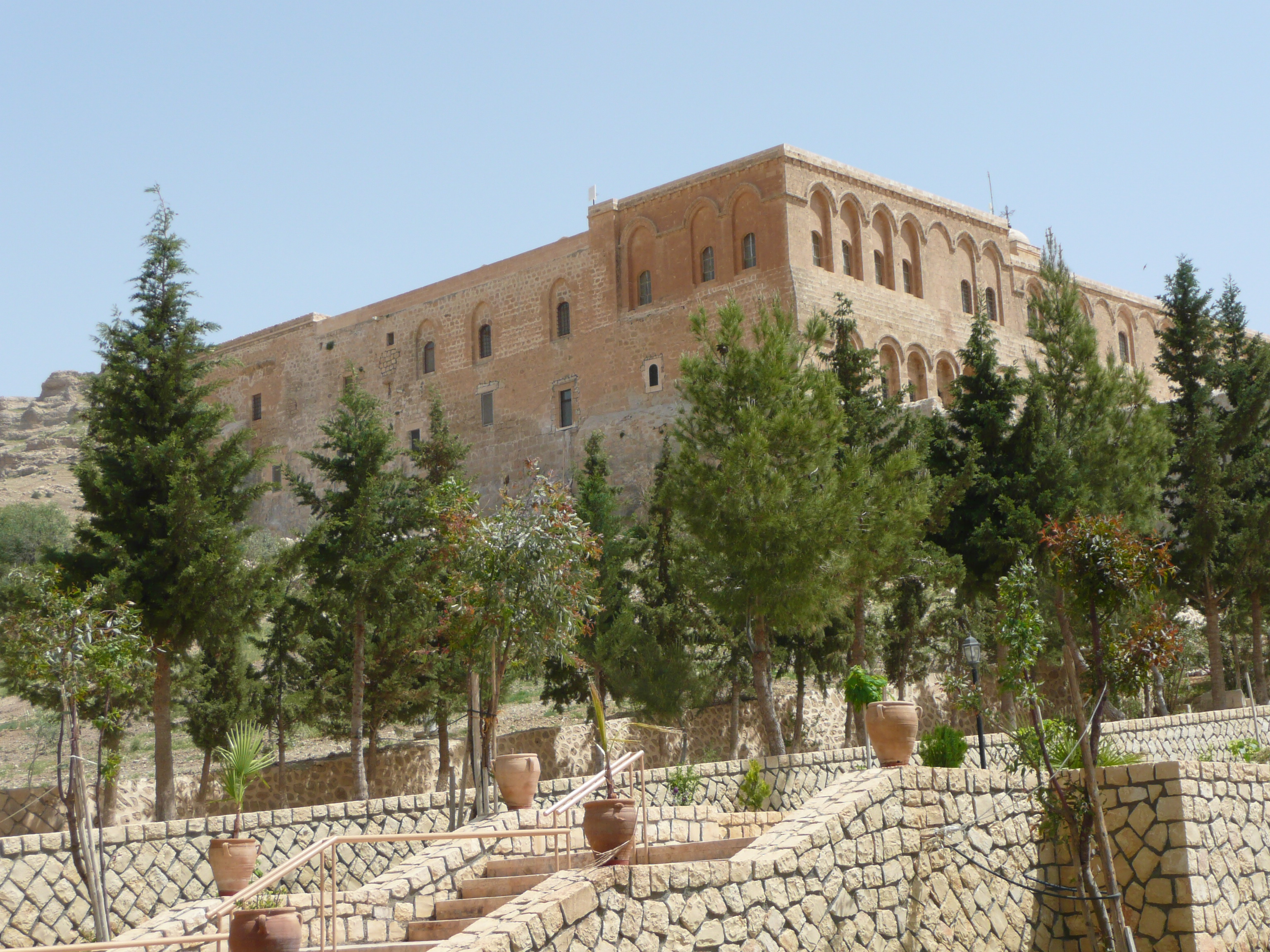
Mor Hananyo Monastery, Patriarchal Vicarate of Mardin near Mardin, Turkey. After the Romans withdrew from the fortress, Mor Shlemon transformed it into a monastery in 493 AD.

The Syriac Orthodox Church, that follows the West Syriac Rite, was present in various southeastern regions of modern Turkey since the early medieval times. Since the 12th century, the patriarchal seat itself was transferred to Mor Hananyo Monastery (Deir al-Za`faran), in southeastern Anatolia near Mardin (modern Turkey), where it remained until 1924. In modern times, active churches are located in Istanbul, Diyarbakır, Adıyaman, and Elazığ. There are many both active and inactive churches in the traditionally Assyrian area of Tur Abdin, which is a region centered in the western area of Mardin Province, and has areas that go into Şırnak, and Batman Province. Up until the 1980s the Syriac population was concentrated there as well, but a large amount of the population has fled the region to Istanbul or abroad due to the Kurdish-Turkish conflict. The Church structure is still organized however, with 12 reverends stationed in churches and monasteries there. Churches were also in several other provinces as well, but during the Seyfo the churches in those churches were destroyed or left ruined.

In modern times, Syriac Orthodox Church hase these provinces in Turkey:

- Patriarchal Vicariate of Istanbul and Ankara under the spiritual guidance and direction of Archbishop Filüksinos Yusuf Çetin.
- Patriarchal Vicariate of Mardin under the spiritual guidance and direction of Archbishop Filüksinos Saliba Özmen.
- Patriarchal Vicariate of Turabdin under the spiritual guidance and direction of Archbishop Timotheus Samuel Aktaş.
- Archbishopric of Adıyaman under the spiritual guidance and direction of Archbishop Gregorius Melki Ürek.

=== Church of the East ===
Historical Church of the East, that followed the East Syriac Rite, was present in various southeastern regions of modern Turkey throughout medieval and early modern times, and the continuation of that presence is embodied in the modern Assyrian Church of the East, and the Ancient Church of the East. Ecclesiastical structure of East Syriac Christianity in the region was almost completely wiped out in the Assyrian genocide. Originally, one of its main centers was in the region of Hakkari, in the village of Qodchanis, that was the seat of Shimun-line patriarchs from the 17th century up to the advent of modern times. Patriarch Mar Dinkha IV of the Assyrian Church of the East visited Turkey in 2012.

=== Protestant churches ===
Armenian Protestants own 3 churches in Istanbul since the 19th century. There is an Alliance of Protestant Churches in Turkey. There are Protestant churches for foreigners in compounds and resorts, although they are not counted in lists of churches as they are used only by tourists and expatriates.

==== Church of England ====
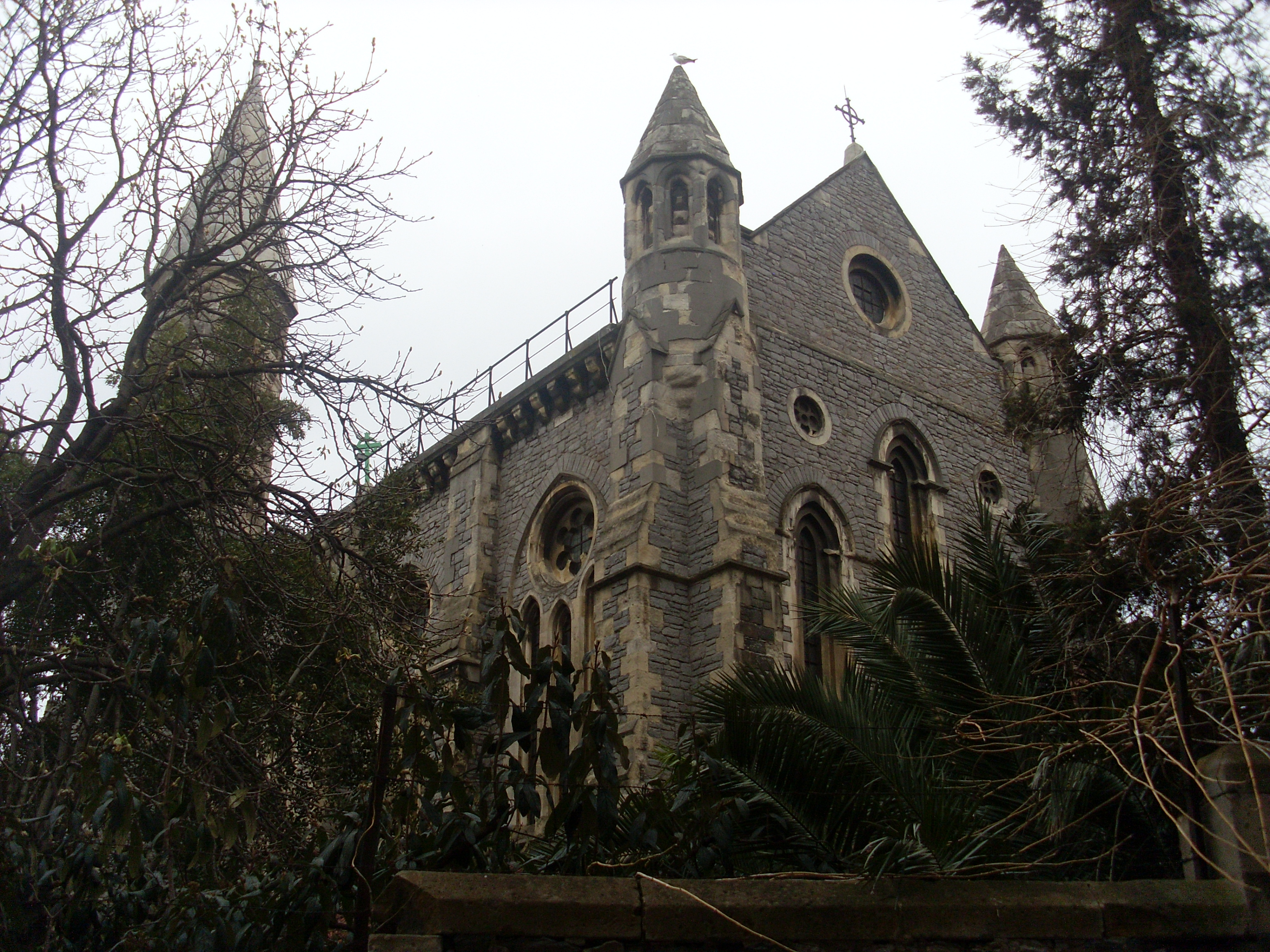
The Crimea Memorial Church in Turkey is under the jurisdiction of the Church of England

Anglicans in Turkey form part of the Eastern Archdeaconry of the Diocese of Gibraltar in Europe. In 2008 the Anglican bishop of Europe, Geoffrey Rowell, caused controversy by ordaining a local man to minister to Turkish-speaking Anglicans in Istanbul.

==== Evangelical churches ====
The Armenian Evangelical Church was founded in 1846, after Patriarch Matteos Chouhajian excommunicated members of the "Pietisical Union" who had started to raise questions about a possible conflicts between the Biblical scriptures and Sacred traditions. The new church was recognized by the Ottoman government in 1850 after encouragement from the British Ambassador Henry Wellesley Cowley. There were reportedly 15 Turkish converts in Constantinople in 1864. One church minister said "We wanted the Turks first to become Armenian". Hagop A. Chakmakjian commented that "the implication was that to be Christian meant to be identified with the Armenian people".

==== The Church of Jesus Christ of Latter-day Saints ====
Recognizing that present-day Ephesus of the New Testament endowed Turkey with historical importance, early leaders of the LDS Church preached in Ottoman Turkey in 1850, and—with the help of British LDS soldiers—organized a congregation in Istanbul in 1854. In 1979, another local community of LDS adherents was organized in Ankara.

== List of church buildings in Turkey ==
=== Churches of the Armenian rite ===
Church name	Picture	Status
Church of the Apparition of the Holy Cross (Kuruçeşme, Istanbul); Yerevman Surp Haç Ermeni Kilisesi		active
Holy Archangels Armenian Church (Balat, Istanbul); Surp Hıreşdagabed Ermeni Kilisesi		active
Holy Cross Armenian Church (Kartal, Istanbul); Surp Nişan Ermeni Kilisesi		active
Holy Cross Armenian Church (Üskudar, Istanbul); Surp Haç Ermeni Kilisesi		active
Holy Hripsimiants Virgins Armenian Church (Büyükdere, Istanbul); Surp Hripsimyants Ermeni Kilisesi		active
Holy Mother-of-God Armenian Apostolic Church (Bakırköy, Istanbul); Surp Asdvadzadzin Ermeni Kilisesi		active
Holy Mother-of-God Armenian Church (Beşiktaş, Istanbul); Surp Asdvadzadzin Ermeni Kilisesi		active
Holy Mother-of-God Armenian Church (Eyüp, Istanbul); Surp Asdvadzadzin Ermeni Kilisesi		active
Holy Mother-of-God Armenian Church (Ortaköy, Istanbul); Surp Asdvadzadzin Ermeni Kilisesi		active
Holy Mother-of-God Armenian Church (Yeniköy, Istanbul); Surp Asdvadzadzin Ermeni Kilisesi		active
Holy Resurrection Armenian Church (Kumkapı, Istanbul); Surp Harutyun Ermeni Kilisesi		active
Holy Resurrection Armenian Church (Taksim, Istanbul); Surp Harutyun Ermeni Kilisesi		active
Holy Three Youths Armenian Church (Boyacıköy, Istanbul); Surp Yerits Mangants Ermeni Kilisesi		active
Holy Trinity Armenian Church (Galatasaray, Istanbul); Surp Yerrortutyun Ermeni Kilisesi		active
Narlıkapı Armenian Apostolic Church (Narlıkapı, Istanbul); Surp Hovhannes Ermeni Kilisesi		active
St. Elijah The Prophet Armenian Church (Eyüp, Istanbul); Surp Yeğya Ermeni Kilisesi		active
St. Garabed Armenian Church (Üsküdar, Istanbul); Surp Garabet Ermeni Kilisesi		active
St. John The Evangelist Armenian Church (Gedikpaşa, Istanbul); Surp Hovhannes Ermeni Kilisesi		active
St. Gregory The Enlightener Armenian Church (Galata, Istanbul)		active
St. Gregory The Enlightener Armenian Church (Kuzguncuk, Istanbul); Surp Krikor Lusaroviç Ermeni Kilisesi		active
St. Gregory The Enlightener Armenian Church (Karaköy, Istanbul); Surp Krikor Lusavoriç Ermeni Kilisesi		active
St. Gregory The Enlightener Armenian Church (Kınalıada, Istanbul); Surp Krikor Lusavoriç Ermeni Kilisesi		active
St. James Armenian Church (Altımermer, Istanbul); Surp Hagop Ermeni Kilisesi		active
St. Nicholas Armenian Church (Beykoz, Istanbul); Surp Nigoğayos Ermeni Kilisesi		active
St. Nicholas Armenian Church (Topkapı, Istanbul); Surp Nigoğayos Ermeni Kilisesi		active
St. Santoukht Armenian Church (Rumelihisarı, Istanbul); Surp Santuht Ermeni Kilisesi		active
St. Saviour Armenian Chapel (Yedikule, Istanbul); Surp Pırgiç Ermeni Kilisesi		active
St. Sergius Armenian Chapel (Balıklı, Istanbul); Surp Sarkis Anıt Mezar Şapeli		active
St. Stephen Armenian Church (Karaköy, Istanbul); Surp Istepanos Ermeni Kilisesi		active
St. Stephen Armenian Church (Yeşilköy, Istanbul); Surp Istepanos Ermeni Kilisesi		active
St. Takavor Armenian Apostolic Church (Kadıkoy, Istanbul); Surp Takavor Ermeni Kilisesi		active
Saints Thaddeus and Barholomew Armenian Church (Yenikapı, Istanbul); Surp Tateos Partoğomeos Ermeni Kilisesi		active
St. Vartanants Armenian Church (Feriköy, Istanbul); Surp Vartanants Ermeni Kilisesi		active
The Twelve Holy Apostles Armenian Church (Kandilli, Istanbul); Surp Yergodasan Arakelots Ermeni Kilisesi		active
Holy Forty Martyrs of Sebastea Armenian Church (Iskenderun, Hatay); Surp Karasun Manuk Ermeni Kilisesi		active
St. George Armenian Church (Derik, Mardin); Surp Kevork Ermeni Kilisesi		active
St. Gregory The Enlightener Armenian Church (Kayseri); Surp Krikor Lusavoriç Ermeni Kilisesi		active
St. Gregory The Enligtener Armenian Church (Kırıkhan, Hatay); Surp Krikor Lusavoriç Kilisesi		active
Church of St. George of Samatya (Samatya, Istanbul); Surp Kevork Kilisesi		active
St. Giragos Armenian Church (Diyarbakır); Surp Giragos Ermeni Kilisesi		active
Vakıflı Church; Vakıflıköy Ermeni Kilisesi		active
Cathedral of Kars		converted into a mosque
Narekavank		destroyed, mosque built on the site
Cathedral of Ani		UNESCO World Heritage Site
Virgin Mary Church, Kayseri		museum (converted into a library)
St. John the Baptist Armenian Church (Uskudar)		unknown
Ktuts Monastery		abandoned
Cathedral of Mren		ruins
Holy Apostles Monastery		ruins
Horomos		ruins
Karmravank		ruins
Kaymaklı Monastery		ruins
Khtzkonk Monastery		ruins
Varagavank		ruins
Saint Bartholomew Monastery		ruins
St. Marineh Church, Mush		ruins
Saint Karapet Monastery		destroyed, village built on the site
St. Stepanos Church		destroyed
Tekor Basilica		destroyed
Vank Church in Şenkaya		destroyed by treasure hunters in 2021

=== Churches of the Byzantine and Greek Orthodox rite ===
Church name	Picture	Status
Church of St. George, Istanbul		active
Church of St. Mary of Blachernae (Istanbul)		active
Church of St. Mary of the Mongols		active
İskenderun St. Nicholas Church		damaged due to 2023 Turkey–Syria earthquake
Mersin Orthodox Church		active
Church of St. Kyriaki, Istanbul		active
Meryem Ana Church		active
Bulgarian St. Stephen Church		active
St. Demetrius Church in Feriköy, Istanbul		active
Hagia Triada Greek Orthodox Church in Beyoğlu, Istanbul		active
Panayia Evangelistria in Beyoğlu, Istanbul		active. Built in 1893.
Saint Andrew in Krisei		converted into a mosque
Chora Church		converted into a mosque
Church of Christ Pantokrator (Constantinople)		converted into the Zeyrek Mosque
Church of Christ Pantepoptes (Constantinople)		converted into a mosque
Monastery of Gastria		converted into a mosque
Hagia Sophia		converted into a mosque
Church of the Holy Apostles		demolished, Fatih Mosque built on top
Church of Saint John the Baptist at Lips (Constantinople)		converted into a mosque
Monastery of Stoudios		to be converted into a mosque
Church of Saint John the Baptist en to Trullo (Constantinople)		converted into a mosque
Myrelaion		converted into a mosque
Church of Saint Nicholas of the Caffariotes (Istanbul)		converted into a mosque
Pammakaristos Church		converted into a mosque
Church of Sergius and Bacchus		converted into a mosque
Saint Irene church		converted into a mosque
Church of Vefa		converted into a mosque
Holy Martyrs Menodora, Metrodora, and Nymphodora		converted into a mosque
Church of Hagia Thekla tu Palatiu ton Blakhernon		converted into a mosque
Church of Hagios Theodoros (Constantinople)		converted into a mosque
Church of Hagias Theodosias en tois Dexiokratus		converted into a mosque
Church of Saint Thomas		converted into a mosque
Church of the Theotokos Kyriotissa (Constantinople)		converted into a mosque
Nakip Mosque		converted into a mosque
Hagios Eugenios Church		converted into a mosque
Panagia Chrysokephalos Church		converted into a mosque
Virgin Mary Church		converted into a mosque
Hagia Sophia, Trabzon		converted into a mosque
Hagia Sophia, İznik		converted into a mosque
Church of Christ and Saint Stephen		converted into a mosque
Toklu Dede Mosque		converted into a mosque (before was a church of unknown dedication)
Alâeddin Mosque		converted into a mosque (before was a basilica of unknown dedication)
Saint Paul Cathedral		converted into a mosque
Aya Panagia Greek Church (Yaman Dede Mosque), Talas, Kayseri		converted into a mosque
St. Gregory of Nazianzos Church, (Kilise Camii), Güzelyurt, Aksaray.		converted into a mosque
Saint Nicholas church in Helvadere, now Yeni Cami		converted into a mosque
Hagia Irene		museum
Sümela Monastery		museum
Saint Efstathios church in Cappadocia		museum. Built in 1836 in Kayseri.
Virgin Mary Monastery		museum
House of the Virgin Mary		museum
Church of St Nicholas of Myra(Santa Claus) (Demre)		ruins, museum
Taşbaşı Church, Ordu province		museum
Saint John's Church, Gülşehir		museum
Saint Michael Church in Akçaabat		now used for social and cultural activities and museum by the Turkish Ministry of Culture and Tourism, built in 1332
Saint Voukolos Church		now used for social and cultural activities
Kuruköprü Monumental Church		museum
Saint Paul's Church, Tarsus		museum
Saint George Church, Isparta		It was built between 1857 and 1860. Now a library and an endemic plants research center.
Aya Baniya Church, Isparta		It was built around the 1750s. Now the Misparta Fragrance Civilization Museum.
Ayazma Church (Faneromeni Church) in Ayvalık		After Greeks left in 1925 due to the Population exchange between Greece and Turkey, it turned into an olive oil factory, for a period, and because of that the interior of the building changed. There are plans to be turned into a museum.
Church of St. Polyeuctus		archaeological site
Church of St. George between Güzelöz and Başköy in Yeşilhisar		archaeological site.
Aya Maryeros Underground Monastery in Derinkuyu District		archaeological site. 4th century monastery.
Zelve Monastery		archaeological site.
Balatlar Church		archaeological site Originally built as a Roman Imperial bath in the 2nd century, was converted into a church in the late 4th or early 5th century.
Church of the ancient city of Lystra		archaeological site. Archaeologists have unearthed the main church of the ancient city of Lystra during excavations.
Unknown church in İnkaya, Kulp		archaeological site. In 2025, archaeologists uncovered a church which is believed to date back to the reign of Roman Emperor Constantius II. Excavations, which began in 2021, have revealed numerous graves and artifacts. The discoveries confirm that the Byzantine Empire maintained a strong and lasting presence beyond the Euphrates and that Christianity had taken root in the area much earlier than previously believed. Researchers expect further discoveries that could push the church's history even further back.
Monastery complex in Aksu district		archaeological site. Ruins of a large monastery complex in front of Zindan Cave. In the complex, there is a basilica-style structure dating back to the late 5th century A.D. Despite damage from a fire, the site was never fully abandoned, a smaller chapel was later built inside the original church. Traces of late-period frescoes suggest continued sacred use over time.
Church of St. Jean at Ayasuluk Hill		archaeological site. The current building dates back to the Emperor Justinian I, but there was a church building even before that.
Church of the Apostles at Anazarbus		archaeological site.
Churches of Göreme		archaeological sites. In Göreme at Cappadocia there are a lot of old Greek churches.
Basilica of St. John		archaeological site
Çanlı Kilise		archaeological site
Cave monastery of İnceğiz		archaeological site
Gümüşler Monastery		archaeological site
Eskigümüş Monastery		archaeological site
35 churches and chapels in caves at the Ayazini		archaeological site
Church on the Küçük Tavşan Adası		archaeological site. A church of the 6th century.
Selime Cathedral at the Ihlara Valley in Cappadocia		archaeological site
Virgin Mary Church at the Ihlara Valley in Cappadocia		archaeological site
Church in the Lake Sapanca		archaeological site. A Late Antique chapel or church. The building lies underwater and is visible only when the lake’s water level drops.
Chapel at Bağcılar		archaeological site. In 2023, a Greek chapel has been discovered at Bağcılar in Istanbul.
Underwater basilica in Iznik Lake		archaeological site. It was built sometime after 390 AD and destroyed in a big earthquake in 1065.
Saint George Church at Diyarbakır		built around 200 AD, now an art gallery
Bodrum Aya Nikola Church		museum
Saint Analipsis Church (Yüksek Kilise), Aksaray		museum
Niğde Prodromos Church		museum
St. Theodore Church (Üzümlü Kilise), Derinkuyu		museum
Panagia Theoskepastos Monastery, Trabzon		archaeological site.
Saint Anne Church, Trabzon		museum
Jason Church		museum
Vazelon Monastery		archaeological site.
Meryem Ana Monastery		archaeological site.
Sinope Koimesis Church		archaeological site.
Çakırkaya Monastery, Gümüşhane		museum.
Üzümlü Church		museum.
Church within Kaymakli/Anakou Underground City		museum.
Hagia Triada Church, Ayvalık		ongoing restoration.
Church of St. John, Tirilye		transferred to private property after the Greek population was expelled in 1923 and now is a residence
St. Basil's Church, Tirilye		became a Stone School (being used for the workshops for carpentry and iron works) and the "Dündar House" (used as a mess house)
Palace of Antiochos		a hotel is on top of the ruins but some traces of the palace can be seen under a glass floor at the dining hall.
Niğde Küçükköy Church		abandoned
Saint Mary of Constantinople		ruins, converted into a mosque in 1640
Church of the Virgin of the Pharos		ruins
Church of Saint Nicholas on Ayanikola Island in Ordu Province		ruins. The church was built around 1700.
Churchs on Gemiler Island		ruins. The churches on the island date back to the 5th-7th centuries.
St. Paul's Church, Antakya		ruins, due to the 2023 Turkey–Syria earthquakes. Originally built in 1830, the church was severely damaged by an earthquake in 1872. It was later reconstructed and resumed religious services in the 1900s. Plans are currently in place to rebuild it.
Kuştul Monastery		ruins
Göreği Monastery, Fatsa district		ruins
Pavrezi Chapel, Gümüşhane		ruins
Hagios Georgios Monastery, Gümüşhane		ruins
Panagia Monastery, Gümüşhane		ruins
Seven or more ruined churches in Santa		ruins
Kamışlı Kilisesi/Çakrak Church, Alucra district		ruins
Üçayak Byzantine Church		ruins
Hasanaliler Church		ruins
Hodegon Monastery		ruins
Pelekete Monastery		ruins
Medikion Monastery		ruins
Batheos Rhyakos Monastery		ruins, some buildings are used as animal shelters
Kaman Demirli Church (Kilise Kalıntıları), Kaman		ruins of unknown dedication.
Saint Demetrius Monastery on Cunda Island		ruins, built in 1766 destroyed by treasure hunters in 2020
Saint Georgios Church in Nilüfer, Bursa		ruins, built in 1896 and fell down in 2020, because it was neglected
Hutura Hagios Monastery Church in Gümüşhane		ruins, built in the 14th century, it is often plundered by treasure hunters. The library of the monastery is also destroyed.
St. Yuannis Church (Aziz Yuannis Kilisesi) or St. John the Russian Church, Ürgüp		ruins
St. Spyridon Church (Kizil Kilise), Güzelyurt.		ruins
Saint George Kyparissiotes Monastery		ruins
Chapel at Fethiye Castle		unearthed during the excavations at Fethiye Castle. Dates back to the Middle Byzantine period. Excavations conducted within and around the chapel uncovered multiple graves dating back to the Byzantine era.
Saint Gregory of Nyssa Church, Trabzon		destroyed
Heliou Bomon monastery		destroyed

=== Catholic churches ===
Church name	Picture	Status
Church of Santa Maria, Trabzon		active
Virgin Mary Latin Catholic Church (Tubini Şapeli), Kadıköy		active
Cathedral of the Holy Spirit, Istanbul		active
St. Anthony of Padua Church in Istanbul		active
Cathedral of the Annunciation, İskenderun		damaged due to 2023 Turkey–Syria earthquake
Church of St. Anthony, Mersin		active
St. John's Cathedral, İzmir		active
Church of SS Peter and Paul, Istanbul		active
Church of Saint Benoit, Istanbul		active
Church of St. Mary Draperis, Istanbul		active
Saint Paul Church, Adana		active
St. Mary's Church, İzmir		active
St. Térèse Church, Ankara		active
St. George's Catholic Church		active
Notre-Dame de L'Assomption, İstanbul		active
Church of San Domenico (Constantinople)		converted into a mosque
Church of St Peter		museum

=== Churches of the Georgian rite ===
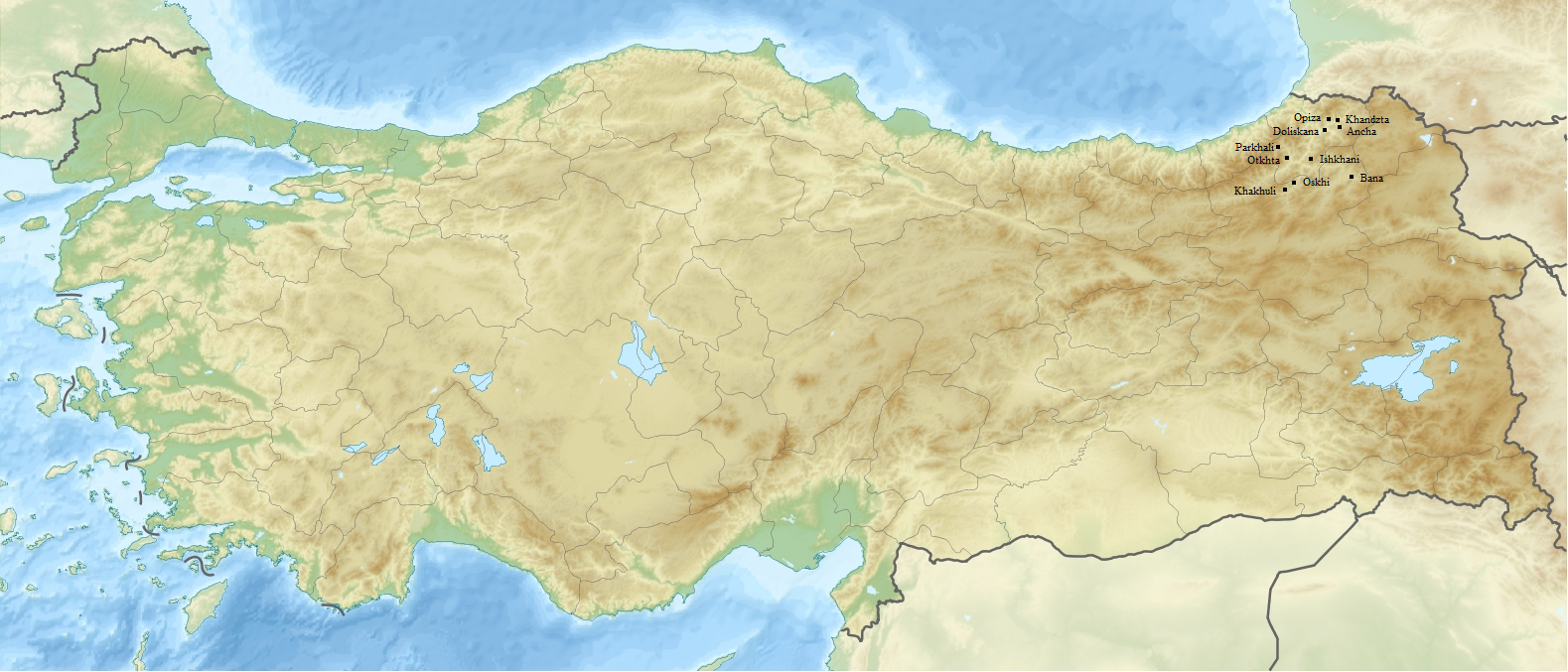
Turkey's historical Georgian churches are located in the northeast of the country.

Church name	Picture	Status
Our Lady of Lourdes Church, Istanbul (Bomonti Gürcü Katolik Kilisesi)		active
Khakhuli Monastery (Haho/Bağbaşı)		converted into a mosque
Doliskana (Dolishane/Hamamlıköy)		converted into a mosque
Ishkhani (İşhan)		protected (since 1987)
Parkhali (Barhal/Altıparmak)		protected
Oshki (Öşki Manastırı/Öşk Vank/Çamlıyamaç)		protected
Otkhta Eklesia (Dörtkilise)		abandoned
Khandzta		ruins
Ekeki		ruins
Parekhi		ruins
Makriali St. George church, Kemalpaşa, Artvin		ruins
St. Barlaam Monastery (Barlaham Manastırı), Yayladağı		ruins
Ancha monastery		ruins
Okhvame, Ardeşen		ruins
Tskarostavi monastery		ruins
Bana cathedral (Penek)		ruins
Tbeti Monastery (Cevizli)		ruins
old Georgian Church, Ani		ruins
Opiza		ruins

=== Protestant churches ===
==== Anglican churches ====
Church name	Picture	Status
Christ Church, Istanbul		active
St. John the Evangelist's Anglican Church, İzmir		active

==== Other churches ====
Church name	Picture	Status
Buca Protestant Baptist Church_{[TR]}		active
Kreuzkirche, İstanbul_{[DE]}		active
Samsun Protestant Church		active
Church of the Resurrection, İzmir		active
All Saints' Church, Moda		active

=== Churches of the Syriac rite ===
Church name	Picture	Status
Mor Sharbel Syriac Orthodox church in Midyat		active
Mor Gabriel Monastery		active
Mor Ephrem Syriac Orthodox Church, Yeşilköy, Istanbul		active
Mor Hananyo Monastery		active
Mor Kuryakos Church in Bağlarbaşı, Midyat		active
Mor Yuhanna Monastery in Eğil		museum
Zuqnin Monastery		
Mor Kiryakus Monastery in Beşiri District		museum
Reji Church in Sanlıurfa		Social centre.

== List of settlements ==
=== Istanbul ===
==== Significant Christian population ====
- Balat, Fatih
- Fener, Fatih
- Moda, Kadıköy

=== Hatay ===
==== Majority Christian population ====
- Vakıflı, Samandağ

=== Mardin ===
==== Majority Christian population ====
- Anıtlı, Midyat
- Beth Kustan, Midyat
- Elbeğendi, Midyat
- Gülgöze, Midyat
- Taşköy, Nusaybin
- Üçköy, Nusaybin
- Üçyol, Nusaybin
- Dağiçi, Nusaybin
- Bülbül, Yeşilli
- Dereiçi, Savur
- Çatalçam, Dargeçit

==== Significant Christian population ====
- Altıntaş, Midyat
- Bardakçı, Midyat
- Barıştepe, Midyat
- Budaklı, Midyat
- Doğançay
- Güngören, Midyat
- İzbırak, Midyat
- Narlı, Midyat
- Mercimekli, Midyat
- Ortaca, Midyat
- Yemişli, Midyat
- Dibek, Nusaybin
- Odabaşı, Nusaybin
- Girmeli, Nusaybin
- Günyurdu, Nusaybin

=== Şırnak ===
==== Majority Christian population ====
- Öğündük, İdil
- Haberli, İdil
- Kösreli, Silopi
- Aksu, Silopi
- Cevizağacı, Beytüşşebap

=== Rize ===
- Çamlıhemşin
- Çayeli

=== Artvin ===
Hopa

=== Trabzon ===
- Araklı

=== Mersin ===
- Tarsus

== See also ==
- Catholic Church in Turkey
- Christianity and Islam
- Christianity in Cyprus
- Christianity in the Ottoman Empire
- Eastern Orthodoxy in Turkey
- Destroyed Armenian churches in Turkey
- Freedom of religion in Turkey
- Human rights in the Middle East
- Human rights in Muslim-majority countries#Turkey
- Human rights in Turkey#Freedom of religion
- Irreligion in Turkey
- Islam and other religions
- Islam in Turkey
- Karamanlides, a Turkish-speaking Greek Orthodox community
  - Autocephalous Turkish Orthodox Patriarchate
- Nestorian rebellion
- Persecution of Christians in the Muslim world
- Protestantism in Turkey
- Religion in the Middle East
- Religion in Turkey
- Religious minorities in Turkey
  - Armenians in Turkey
  - Assyrians in Turkey
  - Greeks in Turkey
  - Jews in Turkey
  - Kurds in Turkey
  - Yazidis in Turkey
- Secularism in Turkey
- Xenophobia and discrimination in Turkey
- Xenophobia and racism in the Middle East

== Sources ==
- Aboona, Hirmis (2008). Assyrians, Kurds, and Ottomans: Intercommunal Relations on the Periphery of the Ottoman Empire. Amherst: Cambria Press. ISBN 9781604975833. Archived from the original on January 15, 2023.
- Armbruster, Heidi (2002). "Homes in Crisis: Syrian Orthodox Christians in Turkey and Germany". New Approaches to Migration? Transnational Communities and the Transformation of Home. London: Routledge. pp. 17–33. ISBN 9781134523771. Archived from the original on January 15, 2023.
- Atto, Naures; Barthoma, Soner O. (2017). "Syriac Orthodox Leadership in the Post-Genocide Period (1918–26) and the Removal of the Patriarchate from Turkey". Let Them Not Return: Sayfo - The Genocide Against the Assyrian, Syriac, and Chaldean Christians in the Ottoman Empire. New York-Oxford: Berghahn Books. pp. 113–131. ISBN 9781785334993. Archived from the original on January 15, 2023.
- Baum, Wilhelm (2004). "Die sogenannten Nestorianer im Zeitalter der Osmanen (15. bis 19. Jahrhundert)". Zwischen Euphrat und Tigris: Österreichische Forschungen zum Alten Orient. Münster-Wien: LIT Verlag. pp. 229–246. ISBN 9783825882570. Archived from the original on January 15, 2023.
- Beitrag, Onders (2012). "Minority Rights in Turkey: Quo Vadis, Assyrians?". The Slow Disappearance of the Syriacs from Turkey and of the Grounds of the Mor Gabriel Monastery. Münster: LIT Verlag. pp. 99–120. ISBN 9783643902689. Archived from the original on January 15, 2023.
- Brock, Sebastian P. (2012). "The Monastery of Mor Gabriel: A Historical Overview and Its Wider Significance Today". The Slow Disappearance of the Syriacs from Turkey and of the Grounds of the Mor Gabriel Monastery. Münster: LIT Verlag. pp. 181–200. ISBN 9783643902689. Archived from the original on January 15, 2023.
- Çelik, Zeynep (1993). The Remaking of Istanbul: Portrait of an Ottoman City in the Nineteenth Century. Berkeley and Los Angeles: University of California Press. ISBN 978-0-520-08239-7.
- Fischbach, Ingrid (2012). "Persecution of Christians in Turkey". The Slow Disappearance of the Syriacs from Turkey and of the Grounds of the Mor Gabriel Monastery. Münster: LIT Verlag. pp. 171–177. ISBN 9783643902689. Archived from the original on January 15, 2023.
- Frazee, Charles A. (2006) [1983]. Catholics and Sultans: The Church and the Ottoman Empire 1453-1923. Cambridge: Cambridge University Press. ISBN 9780521027007. Archived from the original on January 15, 2023.
- Jakob, Joachim (2014). Ostsyrische Christen und Kurden im Osmanischen Reich des 19. und frühen 20. Jahrhunderts. Münster: LIT Verlag. ISBN 9783643506160. Archived from the original on January 15, 2023.
- Murre van den Berg, Heleen (2009). "Chaldeans and Assyrians: The Church of the East in the Ottoman Period". The Christian Heritage of Iraq. Piscataway: Gorgias Press. pp. 146–164. ISBN 9781607241119. Archived from the original on January 15, 2023.
- Murre van den Berg, Heleen (2015). Scribes and Scriptures: The Church of the East in the Eastern Ottoman Provinces (1500-1850). Louvain: Peeters Publishers. ISBN 9789042930797. Archived from the original on January 15, 2023.
- Nieper, Jens (2012). "The Syrian Orthodox Church: The Aramean Community as an Ecumenical Entity in a Transnational Dimension". The Slow Disappearance of the Syriacs from Turkey and of the Grounds of the Mor Gabriel Monastery. Münster: LIT Verlag. pp. 57–62. ISBN 9783643902689. Archived from the original on January 15, 2023.
- Sommer, Renate (2012). "The Role of Religious Freedom in the Context of the Accession Negotiations between the European Union and Turkey - The Example of the Arameans". The Slow Disappearance of the Syriacs from Turkey and of the Grounds of the Mor Gabriel Monastery. Münster: LIT Verlag. pp. 157–170. ISBN 9783643902689. Archived from the original on January 15, 2023.
- Meyendorff, John (1982). The Byzantine Legacy in the Orthodox Church. Yonkers: St Vladimir's Seminary Press. ISBN 978-0-913836-90-3.
