= Church of St. John, Tirilye =

Former Greek-Orthodox church in Turkey

Agios Ioannis
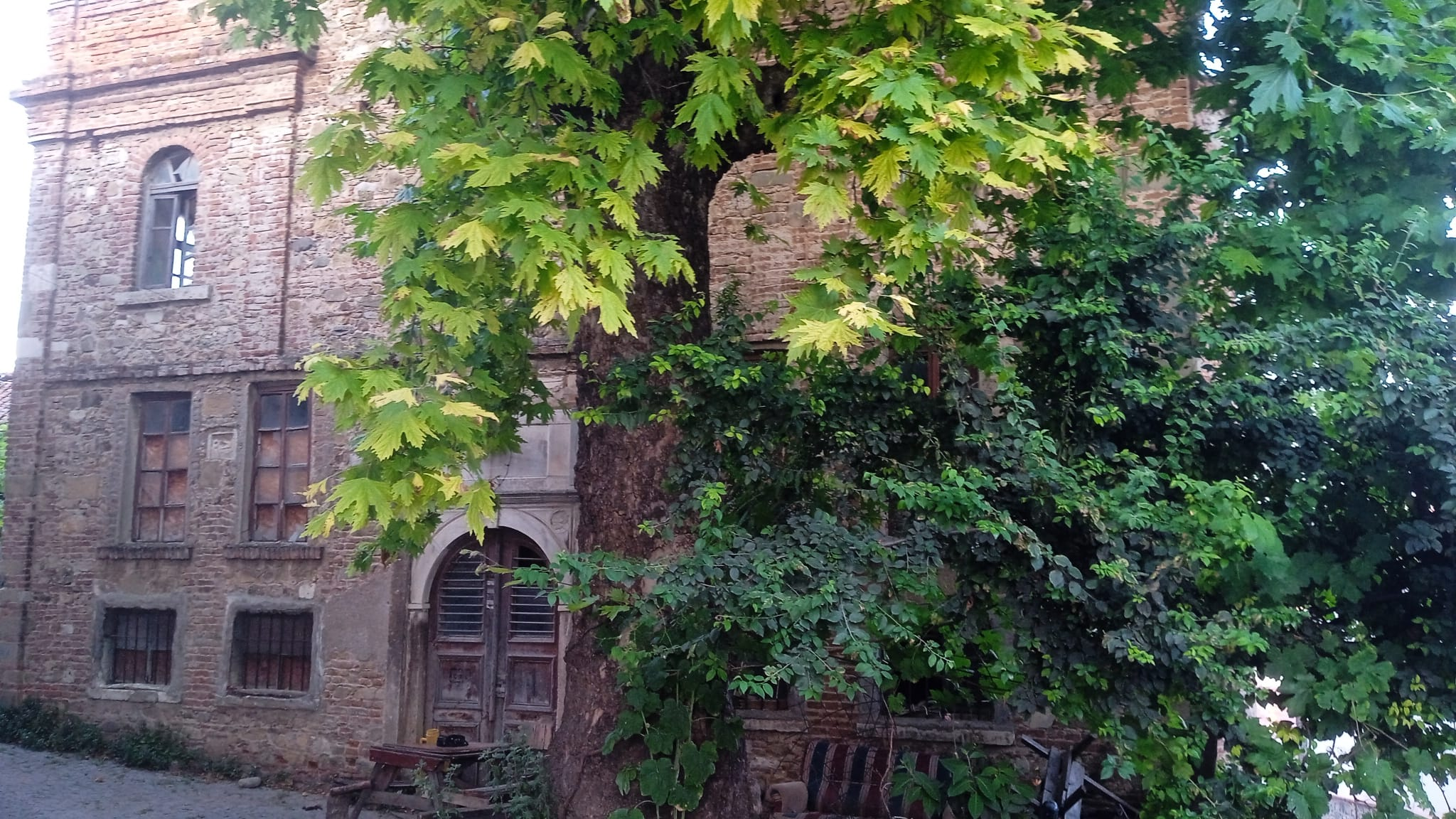

Religion
- Affiliation: Greek Orthodox

Location
- Location: Tirilye, Bursa, Turkey
- Interactive map of Agios Ioannis

Architecture
- Type: Church
- Style: Byzantine architecture

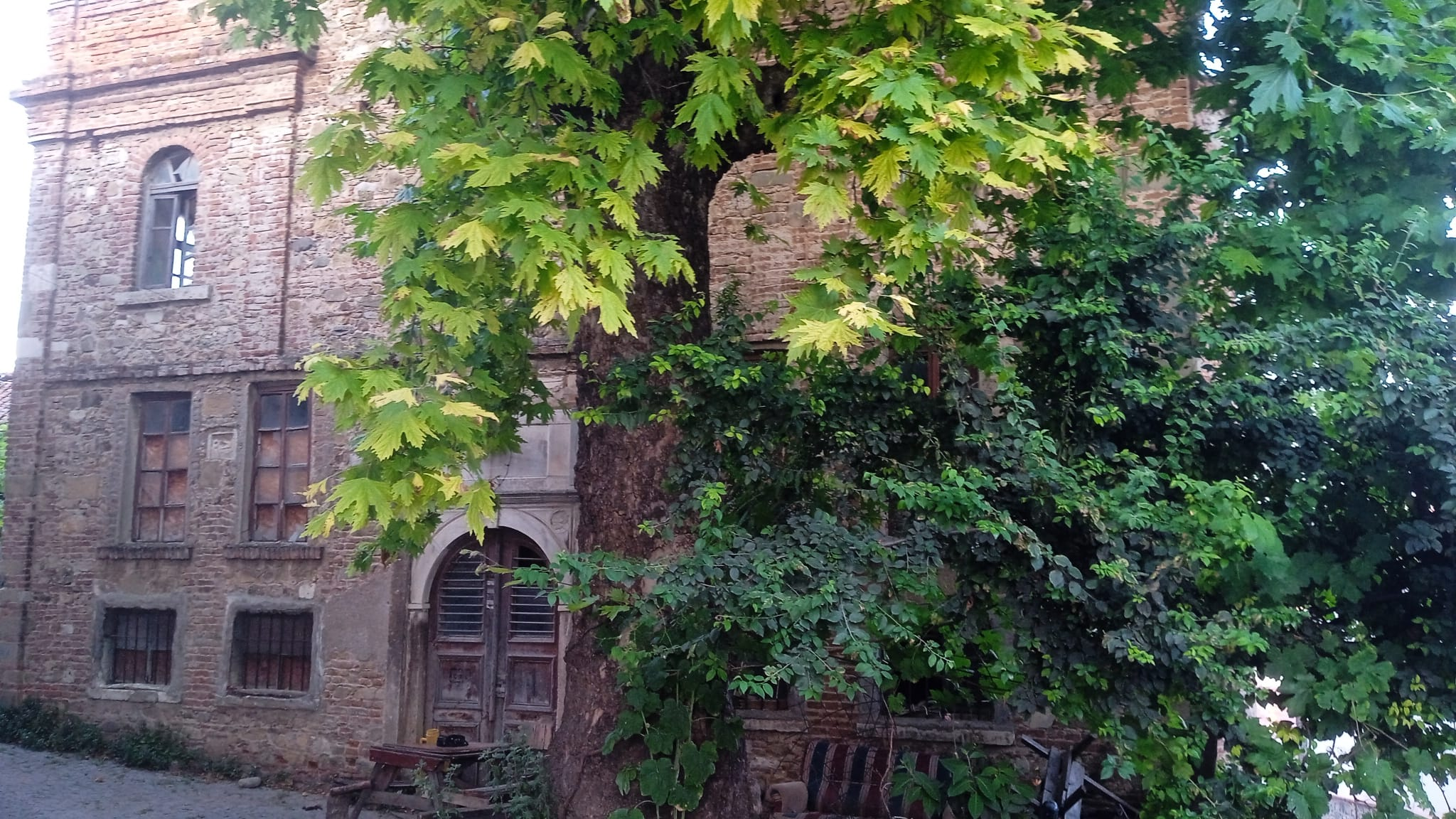
Church of St. John, Tirilye 6.jpg

The Church of St. John (Greek: Άγιος Ιωάννης, Agios Ioannis) (Turkish: Aziz Yuhanna Kilisesi) in Tirilye, known as the Dündar House in the area today, is a former Greek Orthodox church that has been transferred to private property after the Greek population left during the 1923 population exchange between Greece and Turkey.

The three-storey western part of the church, which was constructed in the 19th century, is currently being used as a residence. The main entrance is through a stone door. There are Byzantine-style decorations and stone ornaments on its walls.
