= St. Basil's Church, Tirilye =

Former Greek-Orthodox church in Turkey

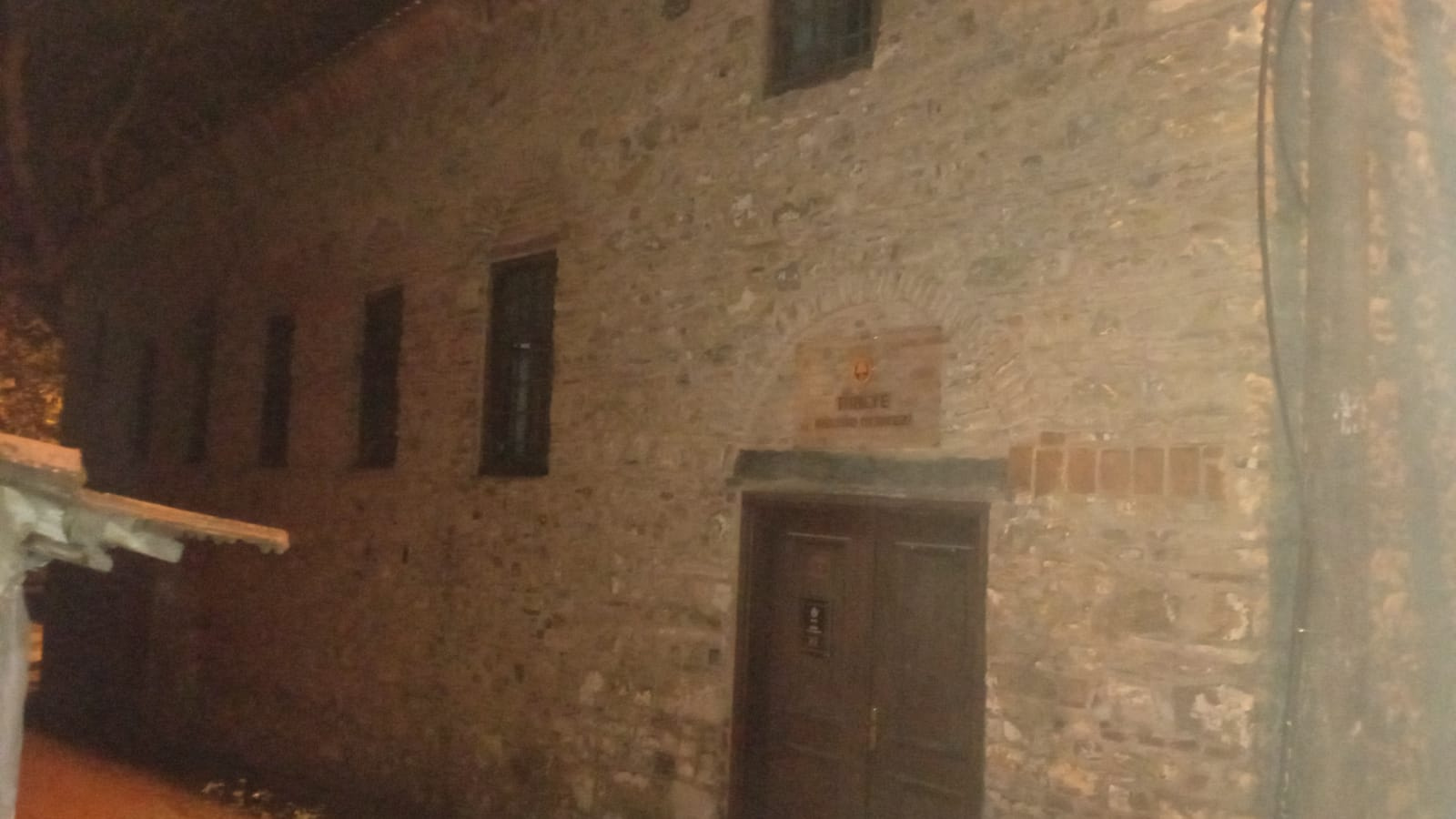

Religion
- Affiliation: Christianity

Location
- Location: Tirilye, Bursa, Turkey
- Interactive map of St. Basil's Church, Tirilye

Architecture
- Type: Church

The St. Basil's Church (Turkish: Aziz Vasil Kilisesi) is a former Greek Orthodox church in Tirilye, known as the Tirilye Cultural Center in the area today. The complex was built as a Greek church even before the 19th century and was used as such until the Greco-Turkish population exchange in 1922.

It has been constructed in Triglia before 19th century and reconstructed in 1858 by a sultan's permission as we know now from Ottoman archives. It was one of the 6 Triglia's churches and neighborhoods with the same name. Today it is also known as the Dar-ül Eytam School, which opens to the Stone School (being used for the workshops for carpentry and iron works for 400 students), and the “Dündar House", used as a mess house. The church had three vertical lines similar to all other churches(Vertical lines are separated with columns), but the abscissa of the church was demolished for creating a new entrance, causing the upper part of the entrance to be higher than the sides. The Church building was used as a mess hall until the school was closed in September 1927. Due to its function it was called “mess hall” until its restoration, which turned the building into Faruk Çelik Cultural Center. Upon the request of the Greek Culture Delegation a ceremony was held in this building during the visit of the Ecumenical Patriarch of Constantinople Bartholomew I to Tirilye on July 1, 2009. Starting from 2019 a "Theofaneia" ceremony is held each year (on 19/1/2019, 20/1/2020 and 19/1/2021) by Patriarch Bartholomew.
