= Mersin Orthodox Church =

Church in Mersin, Turkey

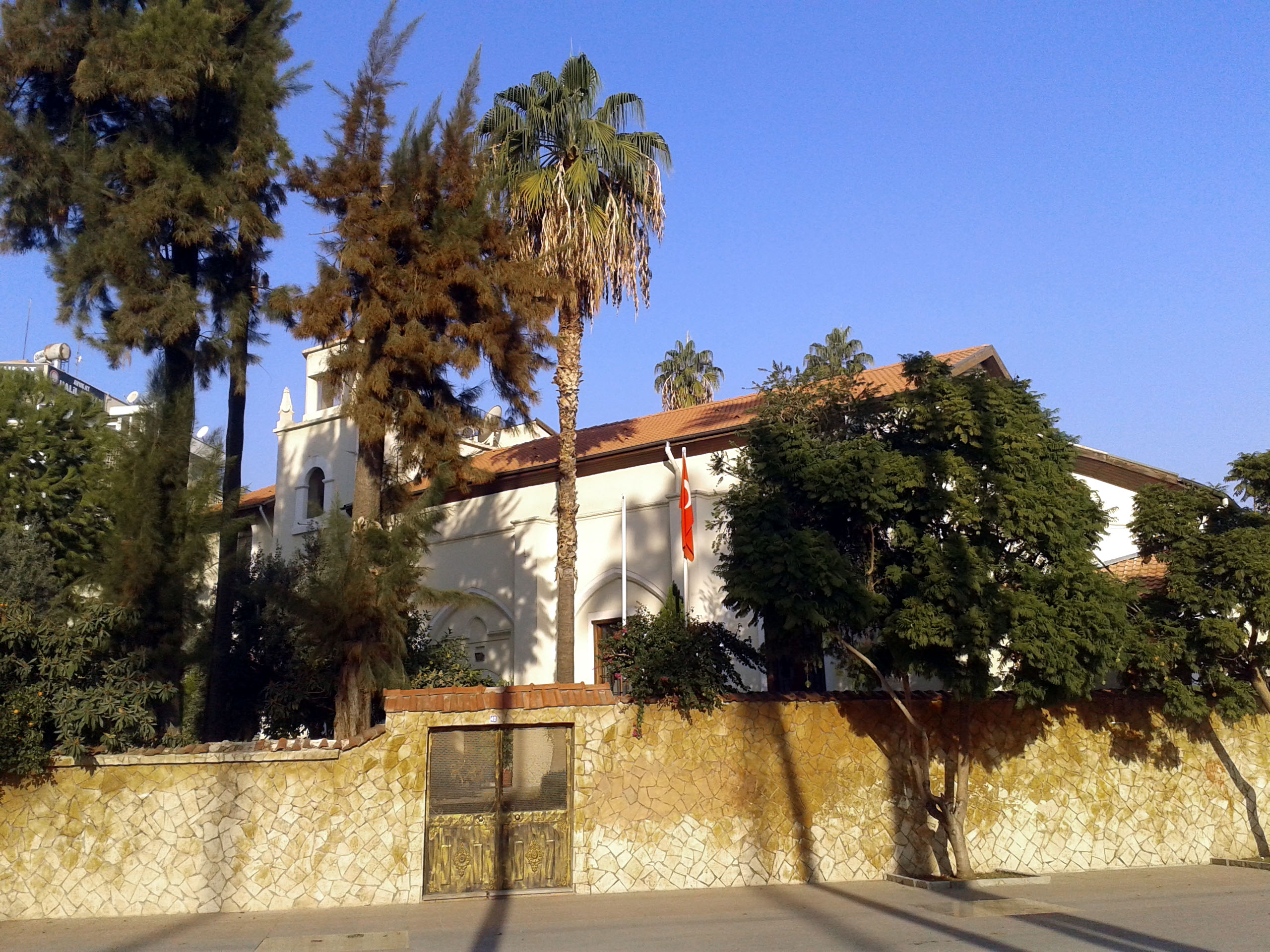

Mersin Orthodox Church (Turkish: Mersin Ortodoks Kilisesi) is a church in Mersin, Turkey.

== Geography ==
The church is at 36°47′36″N 34°37′30″E is to the south of Mersin Halkevi and to the west of Mersin Atatürk Monument. It is 80 metres (260 ft) to İsmet İnönü Boulevard and 200 metres (660 ft) to the Mediterranean Sea coast.

== History ==
The church was built in 1870 during the Ottoman Empire era. Its building area was donated by Dimitri Nadir and Tannus Nadir and it was commissioned by Christians who migrated from Syria and Lebanon (then parts of the Ottoman Empire). According to an inscription it was dedicated to Mihail Athangelos (Michael). An external source says it was also dedicated to Gabriel.

== Dependency ==
The church is under the control of the Antiochian Orthodox Church.
