= Saint George Kyparissiotes Monastery =

Monastery in Bursa Province, Turkey

Coordinates: 40.3908°N 28.8114°E

Saint George Kyparissiotes
- Interactive map of Saint George Kyparissiotes

Monastery information
- Established: 956

Site
- Location: Tirilye, Turkey

Saint George Kyparissiotes (Greek: Άγιος Γεώργιος ο Κυπαρισσιώτης Agios Georgios o Kypatissiotis; Turkish: Aziz Yorgi Kilisesi) or Aya Yorgi is a ruined Byzantine-era monastery near modern Tirilye in Bursa Province, Turkey (medieval Trigleia in Bithynia).

It was built in 956 and was used as a church until the Greco-Turkish population exchange in 1922.
