= Abhai =

Abhai may refer to:

== Saints ==
- Abhai (saint), patron saint against poisonous reptiles
- Abhai (teacher), the teacher of Abhai the general and a Christian saint
- Abhai the general, a Persian Christian martyr
- Abhai of Hach, abbot and saint of the Syriac Orthodox Church
- Mar Abhai, a saint of the Syriac Orthodox Church

== Other uses ==
- Abhai (pentagraph), a single specific sound (phoneme) in the Irish language
