= Gelinkaya, Midyat =

Village in Mardin Province, Turkey

Gelinkaya
- Neighbourhood
- Location in Turkey
- Coordinates: 37.418°N 41.269°E
- Country: Turkey
- Province: Mardin
- District: Midyat
- Population (2022): 1,542
- Time zone: UTC+3 (TRT)

Gelinkaya (Arabic: کفر خۆار, romanized: Kafarḥuvar; Syriac: Keferhavro, lit. 'white stone village') (Note: Also translated as "white village". Alternatively transliterated as Kafar Hura, Kafr Ḥwārā, Kfar Ḥawar or Kfarhıvvar.) is a village in the municipality and district of Midyat, Mardin Province, Turkey. Its population is 1,542 (2022). Before the 2013 reorganisation, it was a town (belde). The village is populated by Kurds and Mhallami. It is located in the historic region of Bēth Muḥallam in Tur Abdin.

== History ==
Keferhavro (today called Gelinkaya) was historically inhabited by Syriacs. The Eastern Roman Emperor Anastasius I Dicorus (r. 491–518) is said to have donated the village to the Mor Gabriel Monastery. The village's population converted to Islam to escape persecution in 1583. It became the administrative centre for the Mhallami in the 1850s when a beg from nearby Dêrizbin settled at Keferhavro after a conflict with his relatives and seized the village's church to use as his residence. Kurds from the nearby villages of Deywan and Helex and the Sinjar region later also settled at the village.

== Notable people ==
- Orhan Miroğlu (b. 1953), Turkish politician

== Bibliography ==
- Abed Mshiho Neman of Qarabash (2021) [1918]. Sayfo – An Account of the Assyrian Genocide. Translated by Michael Abdalla; Łukasz Kiczko. Edinburgh University Press.
- Barsoum, Aphrem (2008). The History of Tur Abdin. Translated by Matti Moosa. Gorgias Press.
- Bilge, Yakup (2012). "The Saint Gabriel Monastery Trust". In Pieter Omtzigt; Markus K. Tozman; Andrea Tyndall (eds.). The Slow Disappearance of the Syriacs from Turkey and of the Grounds of the Mor Gabriel Monastery (PDF). LIT Verlag Münster. pp. 209–218.
- İşler, İbrahim, ed. (2018). Midyat'ta Konuşulan Muhallemi Lehçesi: Arapça-Türkçe Sözlük (in Turkish). Mevsimler.
- Palmer, Andrew (1990). Monk and Mason on the Tigris Frontier: The Early History of Tur Abdin. Cambridge University Press.
- Tan, Altan (2018). Turabidin'den Berriye'ye. Aşiretler - Dinler - Diller - Kültürler (in Turkish). Pak Ajans Yayincilik Turizm Ve Diş Ticaret Limited şirketi. ISBN 9789944360944.
