= Orhan Miroğlu =

Turkish politician

Member of the Grand National Assembly of Turkey
- In office June 2015 – June 2018
- Constituency: Mardin

Personal details
- Born: 1 January 1953 (age 73) Gelinkaya, Midyat, Turkey
- Citizenship: Turkish
- Party: AKP

Orhan Miroğlu (born 1 January 1953, Midyat, Turkey) is a Turkish politician of Mhallami origin and columnist for Taraf and Today's Zaman.

== Education and early life ==
Born to Mhallami Arab parents in the village of Gelinkaya, Miroğlu spent his youth in Batman and Diyarbakır and following his graduation from the Diyarbakir Vocational School he was employed as a teacher for a year. He was arrested in the aftermath of the coup d'état in 1980. He was sentenced to fifteen years imprisonment for his involvement in the Socialist Party of Kurdistan. He was released in 1988. On the 20 September 1992, he was wounded during the assassination of Musa Anter, which he says was carried out by the Turkish Gendarmerie's JITEM. Miroğlu speaks native level Turkish, advanced level of Kurdish and Arabic, and an intermediate level of English. His mother knew Arabic and Kurdish.

== Political career ==
He was involved in several pro-Kurdish parties like the Peoples Democratic Party (HADEP), the Democratic Peoples Party (DEHAP) or the Democratic Society Party (DTP). He was banned from politics for five years, following the 2009 closure of the Democratic Society Party (DTP). Later he joined the Justice and Development Party (AKP) and was elected as a member of parliament representing Mardin in the parliamentary elections of June 2015, and the following snap elections of November 2015.

In January 2021, he claimed that Joe Biden, the president of the United States was actually a Kurd of the Biruki tribe.

== Professional career ==
Miroglu was a journalist for several newspapers such as the Taraf, the Zaman, Özgür Politika, or Radikal.

== Books ==
- Dıjwar – Onlara Dair Her Şey (Avesta Yayınları, 2004)
- Çapraz Ateşte İki Halk: Türkler ve Kürtler – Yeni Jeopolitika ve Nasyonalizm (Beybûn, 2005).
- O'na Zarfsız Kuşlar Gönderin- Uğur KAYMAZ Kitabı (agorakitaplığı)
- Kuşatmadan İnfaza: Musa Anter Cinayeti - on the 1992 assassination of Musa Anter.
