= Budaklı, Midyat =

Village in Mardin Province, Turkey

Budaklı
- Neighbourhood
- Location within Turkey
- Coordinates: 37.379°N 41.350°E
- Country: Turkey
- Province: Mardin
- District: Midyat
- Population (2021): 1,075
- Time zone: UTC+3 (TRT)

Budaklı (Note: Also spelt as Bucakli.) (Kurdish: Kerşaf; Syriac: Kafar Shama) (Note: Also known as Kafarshāma, Kafar Šama’, Kafr Šma‛, Kafrō Šma, Karshaf, Keferchoma, Keferşamo, Kefer Şama, Kefšaf, Kerşafê, Kfar Shaf, Kfar Shomaʿ, Kfarshomaʿ, or Kfarşoma.) is a neighbourhood in the municipality and district of Midyat, Mardin Province in Turkey. The village is populated by Mhallami and by Kurds of the Şemikan tribe and had a population of 1,075 in 2021. (Note: According to Tan, the village is inhabited by Christian Syriacs and Muslim Kurds.) It is located in the historic region of Bēth Muḥallam in Tur Abdin.

== Etymology ==
The name Keferşamo is derived from "kefer" ("village" or "settlement" in Arabic and Syriac).

== History ==
Kafar Shama (today called Budaklı) is said to have been donated to the Mor Gabriel Monastery by the Eastern Roman Emperor Anastasius I Dicorus (r. 491–518). Mar Hercala the Hermit, mentioned in the Martyrology of Rabban Sliba, was a monk at the monastery of Kafar Shama. Rabban Shim’un (Simon) of Kafar Salt, a monk at the Monastery of Mar Sahrbil in Kafar Shama’, was a notable calligrapher (fl. 1218). The monk Gewargis of Kafar Shama is named amongst those who were killed in the Cave of Ibn Siqi by the soldiers of Timur in 1394. 300 people were suffocated to death by smoke at Kafar Shama by Timur's soldiers in 1395. In 1454 (AG 1765), a large number of men from the village were suffocated to death by smoke by Turks of the clan of Hasan Beg, as per the account of the priest Addai of Basibrina in c. 1500 appended to the Chronography of Bar Hebraeus.

One priest and two deacons were ordained for the Church of Morī Ya‛qūb Malfonō at Kafar Shama in the fifteenth century. The Church of Jirjis at Kafar Shama was still active in 1457. The Monasteries of Mar Jacob, Mar Sharbil, Mar Isaiah, Mar Hercala, and Fabronia near Kafar Shama’ are attested in 1517. Philoxenus, metropolitan of Kafar Shama in 1543, was ordained by Patriarch Shim’un (Simon) of Tur Abdin. Basilus Shim’un (Simon) I of Kafar Shama, son of Malke, son of Shalouj, was Maphrian of Tur Abdin in 1549–1555. Ḥabīb, bishop of the Monastery of Morī Ya‛qūb at Kafar Shama in 1582, was ordained by Patriarch Ignatius David II Shah. The Monastery of Mar Yaqub (Jacob) at Kafar Shama was still inhabited in 1583. Muslim Kurds are said to have migrated to the village from the Ağrı, Muş, and Van regions. The Church of Mār Šarbīl was destroyed during the construction of the new mosque.

== Bibliography ==
- Barsoum, Aphrem (2008). The History of Tur Abdin. Translated by Matti Moosa. Gorgias Press.
- Bcheiry, Iskandar (2010). A List of Syriac Orthodox Ecclesiastic Ordinations from the Sixteenth and Seventeenth Century: The Syriac Manuscript of Hunt 444 (Syr 68 in Bodleian Library, Oxford). Gorgias Press.
- Bilge, Yakup (2012). "The Saint Gabriel Monastery Trust". In Pieter Omtzigt; Markus K. Tozman; Andrea Tyndall (eds.). The Slow Disappearance of the Syriacs from Turkey and of the Grounds of the Mor Gabriel Monastery (PDF). LIT Verlag Münster. pp. 209–218.
- Fiey, Jean Maurice (1993). Pour un Oriens Christianus Novus: Répertoire des diocèses syriaques orientaux et occidentaux (in French).
- Fiey, Jean Maurice (2004). Lawrence Conrad (ed.). Saints Syriaques (in French). The Darwin Press.
- Palmer, Andrew (1990). Monk and Mason on the Tigris Frontier: The Early History of Tur Abdin. Cambridge University Press.
- Tan, Altan (2011). Süleyman Çevik (ed.). Turabidin'den Berriye'ye. Aşiretler - Dinler - Diller - Kültürler (in Turkish) (1st ed.).
- Wannes, Sűleyman (2006). Syrisk-ortodoxa kyrkan, en överblick över Institutioner, stiftelser och medlemmar, samt civila och profana organisationer i världen (PDF) (in Swedish).
- Wießner, Gernot (1982). Christliche Kultbauten im Ṭūr ʻAbdīn (in German). Vol. I. Harrassowitz Verlag.
- Yeşilmen, Halit (2017). Mahallemiler ve ebruli kültürün ağırbaşlılığı: değişim, kimlik, din (PDF) (in Turkish). Çizgi Kitabevi.
