= Matiate =

Archaeological site in Turkey

- Location of Matiate in Turkey.
- 37°25′0″N 41°22′11″E
- Type: Underground city
- Location: Midyat, Mardin Province, Turkey
- Region: Southeastern Anatolia Region

History
- Abandoned: yes

Site notes
- Height: 2 m (6.6 ft)
- Length: 1 km (0.62 mi)
- Public access: partially

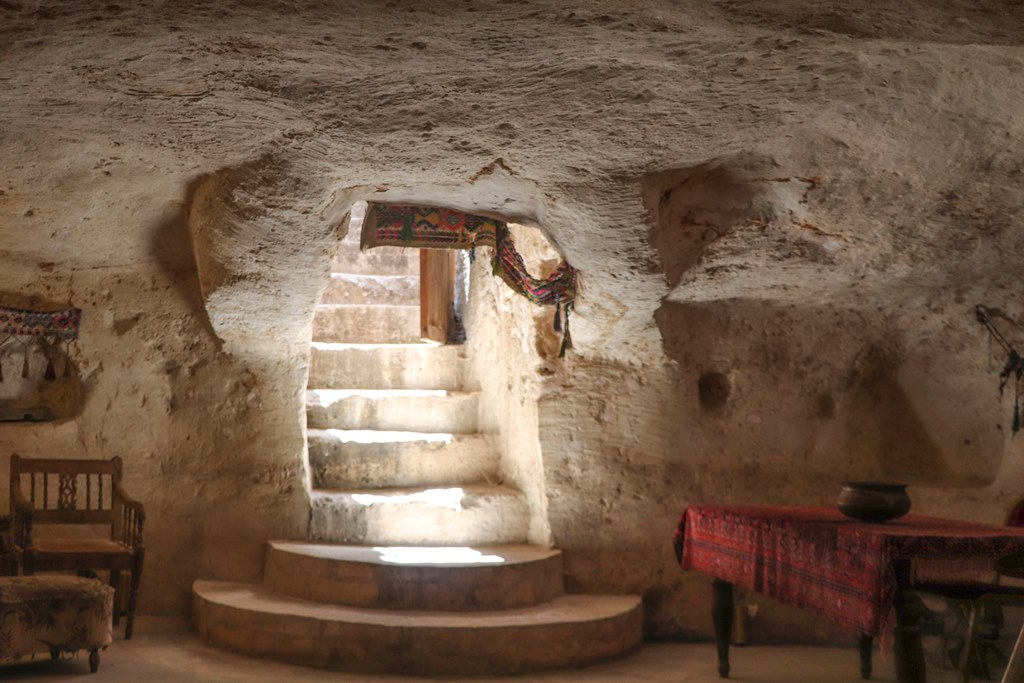
Underground city of Matiate

Matiate is an archaeological site underneath the town of Midyat, in Mardin province, Turkey. It is assumed to have been in use for 1,900 years, at its peak to have been inhabited by up to 70,000 people and is considered to be the largest such system in the world.

== Discovery ==
The tunnel system was discovered by chance in 2020 during renovation works in Midyat's old town. Construction workers unearthed a limestone cave which led to a tunnel and other caves. Subsequent large excavation works began and, by 2022, 49 rooms were made visible. The underground city was called Matiate after the ancient Assyrian name of the city of Midyat, which translates into "city of caves".

== Extension ==
The town's origins date back to the 2nd or 3rd century CE and at its peak it is believed to have been inhabited by between 60,000 and 70,000 people. 100 metres (330 ft) of tunnels and 49 rooms have been unearthed, but it is assumed that only 3% of the city has been discovered. Excavation works were performed in co-operation with the Ministry of Culture and Tourism, Midyat's municipality and the Museum of Mardin and excavations would extend to the whole district of Midyat.

== Function ==
Gani Tarkan, the director of excavations of Matiate, assumes that the cave system was used as a hiding place for persecuted people. During the Roman era, the Christian religion was persecuted and its adherents were known to have lived in similar underground cities throughout Anatolia. In the cave system there is a Christian church and a room with a Star of David, which is assumed to be a Jewish synagogue. Water wells, silos, coins, lamps and bones of humans and animals were also discovered. Researchers assume it was used as a hiding place between the 1st and 6th century. After the population returned to live above surface, it continued in use as a wine cellar and catacomb.
