= Oyuklu, Midyat =

Oyuklu
- Neighbourhood
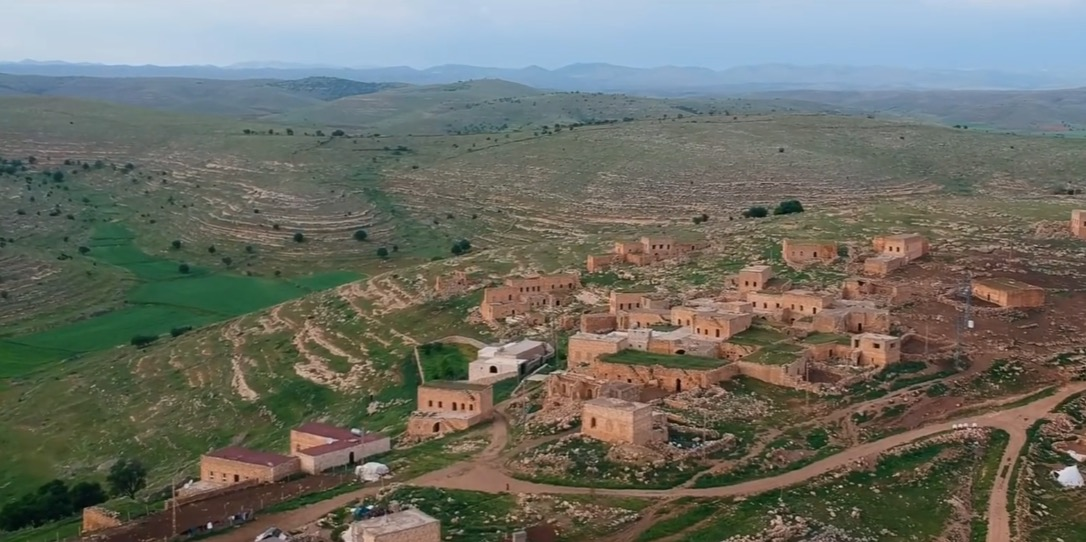

- Location within Turkey
- Coordinates: 37°23′38″N 41°28′6″E
- Country: Turkey
- Province: Mardin
- District: Midyat
- Population (2021): 52
- Time zone: UTC+3 (TRT)

Oyuklu (Kurdish: Taqa), historically known as Taka is a neighbourhood located in the municipality and district of Midyat, the Mardin Province in southeastern Turkey.

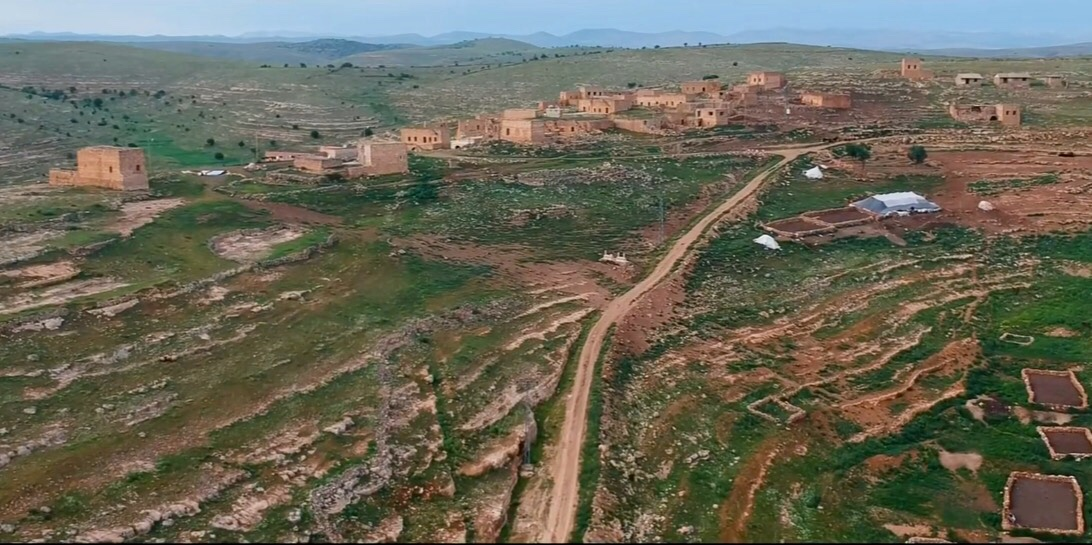
View of Taqa (2018)

The village is populated by Kurds who adhere to Yazidism.

== Population ==
Population
Year	Pop.	±%
1935	134	—
1965	216	+61.2%
1973	229	+6.0%
2000	0	−100.0%
2021	52	—
