= Kayalar, Midyat =

Village in Mardin Province, Turkey

Kayalar
- Neighbourhood
- Location in Turkey
- Coordinates: 37.372°N 41.236°E
- Country: Turkey
- Province: Mardin
- District: Midyat
- Population (2021): 129
- Time zone: UTC+3 (TRT)

Kayalar (Arabic: کفر زوطی, romanized: Kafarzota), is a neighbourhood in the municipality and district of Midyat, Mardin Province in Turkey. The village is populated by the Mhallami and had a population of 129 in 2021.
