= Şenköy, Midyat =

Village in Mardin Province, Turkey

Şenköy
- Neighbourhood
- Location in Turkey
- Coordinates: 37.464°N 41.190°E
- Country: Turkey
- Province: Mardin
- District: Midyat
- Population (2022): 2,269
- Time zone: UTC+3 (TRT)

Şenköy (Kurdish: Epşê) is a neighbourhood of the municipality and district of Midyat, Mardin Province, Turkey. Its population is 2,269 (2022). Before the 2013 reorganisation, it was a town (belde). The village is populated by Kurds of the Habezbenî tribe and by the Mhallami.
