= Tulgalı, Midyat =

Village in Mardin Province, Turkey

Tulgalı
- Neighbourhood
- Location in Turkey
- Coordinates: 37.363°N 41.543°E
- Country: Turkey
- Province: Mardin
- District: Midyat
- Population (2021): 304
- Time zone: UTC+3 (TRT)

Tulgalı (Kurdish: Xirbê Xelîd) is a neighbourhood in the municipality and district of Midyat, Mardin Province in Turkey. The village is populated by Kurds of the Mizizex tribe and had a population of 304 in 2021.
