= Sarıköy, Midyat =

Village in Mardin Province, Turkey

Sarıköy
- Neighbourhood
- Location in Turkey
- Coordinates: 37°21′37″N 41°17′58″E
- Country: Turkey
- Province: Mardin
- District: Midyat
- Population (2021): 784
- Time zone: UTC+3 (TRT)

Sarıköy (Arabic: ساد, romanized: Sed) is a neighbourhood in the municipality and district of Midyat, Mardin Province in Turkey. The village is populated by the Mhallami and had a population of 784 in 2021.
