= Güngören, Midyat =

Village in Mardin Province, Turkey

Güngören
- Neighbourhood
- Location within Turkey
- Coordinates: 37.319°N 41.556°E
- Country: Turkey
- Province: Mardin
- District: Midyat
- Population (2022): 174
- Time zone: UTC+3 (TRT)

Güngören (Kurdish: Keferb, Syriac: Kafarbe, (Note: Alternatively transliterated as Kfārāfayā, Kafar Be, Kafarbē, Kafarbé, Kafyat, Keferbe, Keferbi, Kefr Beh, Kfarbe, or Kfarbo.) or Syriac: ܦܦܝܬ, romanized: Fifyāth) (Note: Alternatively transliterated as Fafah, Fafit, Fōfyāth, Fofyat, or Pofyath. Also known as Bēt Mar Fāfā.) is a village in the municipality and district of Midyat, Mardin Province in Turkey. It is populated by Syriacs and by Kurds of the Dermemikan tribe. The village had a population of 174 in 2022. It is located in the historic region of Tur Abdin.

In the village, there is a church of Mor Stephanos and Mor Yuhannon.

== Etymology ==
The Syriac name of the village Kafarbe is derived from "kefr" ("village" in Syriac).

== History ==
Kafarbe (today called Güngören) is attested in the Life of Abbā Sallārā (d. 664) by the name of Bēt Mar Fāfā. It is mentioned in an inscription from AD 776/777 (AG 1088) at the nearby Mor Gabriel Monastery. The inscription records the placement of a bread trough at the monastery by Isaiah of Fōfyāth, shawshbino (relative by sponsorship) of Mor Zechariah of ‘Ayn-Wardo, who had been a disciple of Mor Simeon of the Olives (d. 734). An inscription at the Church of Mor Stephanos and Mor Yuhannon, dated to AD 779, indicates it was either built or extensively rebuilt in that year. It has been suggested that much of the church's nave was likely rebuilt in 1465. In the 18th century, the village was settled by Dermemikan Kurds from Doğubayazıt. In the Syriac Orthodox patriarchal register of dues of 1870, it was recorded that the village had 17 households, who paid 50 dues, and was served by the Church of Morī Isṭefānūs without a priest.

In 1914, 200 Syriacs inhabited Kafarbe, according to the list presented to the Paris Peace Conference by the Assyro-Chaldean delegation. They belonged to the Syriac Orthodox Church. Amidst the Sayfo, the Syriacs were warned by their Kurdish neighbours to flee and thus 70 Syriacs fled to the nearby Mor Gabriel Monastery, and a Kurdish attack on the village in that year failed. Kafarbe was attacked again in 1917 and most of the surviving villagers were killed. The refugees remained at the monastery until the autumn of 1917, when they were captured following an assault on the monastery by Kurds of the Azzam clan led by Shandi. They were taken to their own parish church where they were then murdered. Only a few Syriacs survived the massacre as some had fled to ‘Ayn-Wardo.

In 1922, Syriac and Kurdish villagers of Kafarbe fought together to successfully expel the Kurds that had occupied the Mor Gabriel Monastery. There were 115 Kurdish-speaking Christians in 20 families at the village in 1966. In the 1970s, the Syriac and Kurdish villagers came into conflict with one another, which led the former to emigrate abroad to Germany and the Netherlands.

== Demography ==
=== Families ===
The following is a list of the number of Syriac families that have inhabited Kafarbe per year stated. Unless otherwise stated, all figures are from the list provided in The Syrian Orthodox Christians in the Late Ottoman Period and Beyond: Crisis then Revival, as noted in the bibliography below.

- 1915: 40
- 1966: 20
- 1978: 21
- 1979: 17
- 1981: 15
- 1987: 8

=== Population ===
Historical population

Year	Pop.	±% p.a.
1985	268	—
1990	296	+2.01%
1997	268	−1.41%

Year	Pop.	±% p.a.
2007	213	−2.27%
2012	190	−2.26%
2017	176	−1.52%

Year	Pop.	±% p.a.
2022	174	−0.23%

Source: 1985 census, 1990 census, 1997 census and TÜIK (2007-2022)

== Bibliography ==
- Abed Mshiho Neman of Qarabash (2021) [1918]. Sayfo – An Account of the Assyrian Genocide. Translated by Michael Abdalla; Łukasz Kiczko. Edinburgh University Press.
- Barsoum, Aphrem (2003). The Scattered Pearls: A History of Syriac Literature and Sciences. Translated by Matti Moosa (2nd ed.). Gorgias Press.
- Barsoum, Aphrem (2008). The History of Tur Abdin. Translated by Matti Moosa. Gorgias Press.
- Bcheiry, Iskandar (2009). The Syriac Orthodox Patriarchal Register of Dues of 1870: An Unpublished Historical Document from the Late Ottoman Period. Gorgias Press.
- Biner, Zerrin Özlem (2020). States of Dispossession: Violence and Precarious Coexistence in Southeast Turkey. University of Pennsylvania Press.
- Brock, Sebastian (2012). "The Monastery of Mor Gabriel: A Historical Overview and its Wider Significance Today". In Pieter Omtzigt; Markus K. Tozman; Andrea Tyndall (eds.). The Slow Disappearance of the Syriacs from Turkey and of the Grounds of the Mor Gabriel Monastery (PDF). LIT Verlag Münster. pp. 181–200.
- Çetinoğlu, Sait (2018). "Genocide/ Seyfo – and how resistance became a way of life". In Hannibal Travis (ed.). The Assyrian Genocide: Cultural and Political Legacies (PDF). Translated by Abdulmesih BarAbraham. Routledge. pp. 178–191.
- Courtois, Sébastien de (2004). The Forgotten Genocide: Eastern Christians, The Last Arameans. Translated by Vincent Aurora. Gorgias Press.
- Courtois, Sébastien de (2013). "Tur Abdin : Réflexions sur l'état présent descommunautés syriaques du Sud-Est de la Turquie,mémoire, exils, retours". Cahier du Gremmamo (in French). 21: 113–150.
- Dinno, Khalid S. (2017). The Syrian Orthodox Christians in the Late Ottoman Period and Beyond: Crisis then Revival. Gorgias Press.
- Gaunt, David (2006). Massacres, Resistance, Protectors: Muslim-Christian Relations in Eastern Anatolia during World War I. Gorgias Press.
- Hoyland, Robert G.; Brunner, Kyle B.; Tannous, Jack Boulos Victor (2021). The Life of Simeon of the Olives: An Entrepreneurial Saint of Early Islamic North Mesopotamia. Gorgias Press LLC. ISBN 978-1-4632-4346-3.
- Hoyland, Robert G.; Palmer, Andrew N. (2023). The Life of Theodotus of Amida: Syriac Christianity under the Umayyad Caliphate. Gorgias Press.
- Jongerden, Joost; Verheij, Jelle, eds. (2012). Social Relations in Ottoman Diyarbekir, 1870-1915. Brill.
- Keser Kayaalp, Elif (2021). Church Architecture of Late Antique Northern Mesopotamia. Oxford University Press.
- Palmer, Andrew (1990). Monk and Mason on the Tigris Frontier: The Early History of Tur Abdin. Cambridge University Press.
- Ritter, Hellmut (1967). Turoyo: Die Volkssprache der Syrischen Christen des Tur 'Abdin (in German). Vol. 1. Franz Steiner Verlag.
- Sinclair, T. A (1989). Eastern Turkey: An Architectural & Archaeological Survey. Vol. III.
- Tan, Altan (2018). Turabidin'den Berriye'ye. Aşiretler - Dinler - Diller - Kültürler (in Turkish). Pak Ajans Yayincilik Turizm Ve Diş Ticaret Limited şirketi. ISBN 9789944360944.
