= Yeşilöz, Midyat =

Village in Mardin Province, Turkey

Yeşilöz
- Neighbourhood
- Location in Turkey
- Coordinates: 37.433°N 41.583°E
- Country: Turkey
- Province: Mardin
- District: Midyat
- Population (2021): 282
- Time zone: UTC+3 (TRT)

Yeşilöz (Kurdish: Kemmê) is a neighbourhood in the municipality and district of Midyat, Mardin Province in Turkey. The village is populated by Kurds of the Dermemikan tribe and had a population of 282 in 2021.
