= Eğlence, Midyat =

Village in Mardin Province, Turkey

Eğlence
- Neighbourhood
- Location in Turkey
- Coordinates: 37.349°N 41.514°E
- Country: Turkey
- Province: Mardin
- District: Midyat
- Population (2021): 195
- Time zone: UTC+3 (TRT)

Eğlence or Zinol is a neighbourhood in the municipality and district of Midyat, Mardin Province in Turkey. The village had a population of 195 in 2021.

== Information ==
The village has been described as an Arab village where Kurdish is spoken, but also as a Kurdish village of the Mizizex tribe.
