= Adaklı, Midyat =

Village in Mardin Province, Turkey

Adaklı
- Neighbourhood
- Location in Turkey
- Coordinates: 37.435°N 41.505°E
- Country: Turkey
- Province: Mardin
- District: Midyat
- Population (2021): 91
- Time zone: UTC+3 (TRT)

Adaklı (Kurdish: Kefsura Dermemikan) is a neighbourhood in the municipality and district of Midyat, Mardin Province in Turkey. The village is populated by Kurds of the Dermemikan tribe and had a population of 91 in 2021.
