= Düzgeçit, Midyat =

Village in Mardin Province, Turkey

Düzgeçit
- Neighbourhood
- Location in Turkey
- Coordinates: 37.472°N 41.122°E
- Country: Turkey
- Province: Mardin
- District: Midyat
- Population (2021): 88
- Time zone: UTC+3 (TRT)

Düzgeçit, also known by its Syriac name Zernoka (Syriac: ܙܪܢܩܐ) (Note: Alternatively transliterated as Zarnuqo or Zornuqa.) is a neighbourhood in the municipality and district of Midyat, Mardin Province in Turkey. The village is populated by the Mhallami and had a population of 88 in 2021.

== History ==
The history of the village traces back to ancient Assyria, when Ashurnasirpal II penetrated the Tur Abdin region (Kashiari) and ordered the destruction of the nearby city. His army would march east to Mardin, most likely through Zernoka.

The village also traces its history through the development of Syriac Christianity and the Syriac Orthodox Church. The village was home to a Syriac Orthodox monastery called the monastery of Saint Aho, who is purported to have been the monastery's and larger village's founder.

Zernoka is located in the region of Tur Abdin that was traditionally inhabited by the Mhallami, an Arabic-speaking tribal ethnic group whose origins haven't explicitly been confirmed.

== Demographics ==
Population data by year
2007	89
2008	119
2009	109
2010	95
2011	40
2012	104
2013	93
2014	96
2015	95
2016	89
2017	93
2018	115
2019	118
2020	88
2021	88
