= Çaldere, Midyat =

Village in Mardin Province, Turkey

Çaldere
- Neighbourhood
- Location in Turkey
- Coordinates: 37.302°N 41.265°E
- Country: Turkey
- Province: Mardin
- District: Midyat
- Population (2021): 542
- Time zone: UTC+3 (TRT)

Çaldere (Kurdish: Heverîn) is a neighbourhood in the municipality and district of Midyat, Mardin Province in Turkey. The village is populated by Kurds of the Elîkan tribe and had a population of 542 in 2021.
