= Söğütlü, Midyat =

Village in Mardin Province, Turkey

Söğütlü
- Neighbourhood
- Location in Turkey
- Coordinates: 37.450°N 41.221°E
- Country: Turkey
- Province: Mardin
- District: Midyat
- Population (2022): 2,208
- Time zone: UTC+3 (TRT)

Söğütlü (Arabic: کندیریب, romanized: Kəndērīb; Syriac: ܟܢܕܝܪܝܒ, romanized: Kandirib) (Note: Also spelt as Kandarib, Kenderib, or Kendirib.) is a neighbourhood of the municipality and district of Midyat, Mardin Province, Turkey. Its population is 2,208 (2022). Before the 2013 reorganisation, it was a town (belde). The village is populated by Kurds of the Kercoz and Omerkan tribes and by the Mhallami. It is located in the historic region of Bēth Muḥallam in Tur Abdin.

== History ==
Kandirib (today called Söğütlü) was historically inhabited by Syriac Christians. The calligrapher Daniel of Kandirib is mentioned in the Life of Mar Simeon of the Olives (d. 734). In c. 1583, the Christian population of Bēth Muḥallam, including the village of Kandirib, converted to Islam to escape persecution. From the 1910s onwards, many Mhallamis from the village migrated to Lebanon for economic reasons, while some Mhallami and Kurdish families settled in the village afterwards. The Kurdish families came from Kerboran and neighbouring villages.

== Bibliography ==
- Barsoum, Aphrem (2003). The Scattered Pearls: A History of Syriac Literature and Sciences. Translated by Matti Moosa (2nd ed.). Gorgias Press.
- Barsoum, Aphrem (2008). The History of Tur Abdin. Translated by Matti Moosa. Gorgias Press.
- Barsoum, Aphrem (2009). The Collected Historical Essays of Aphram I Barsoum. Vol. 1. Translated by Matti Moosa. Gorgias Press.
- Hoyland, Robert G.; Brunner, Kyle B.; Tannous, Jack Boulos Victor (2021). The Life of Simeon of the Olives: An Entrepreneurial Saint of Early Islamic North Mesopotamia. Gorgias Press LLC. ISBN 978-1-4632-4346-3.
- Palmer, Andrew (1990). Monk and Mason on the Tigris Frontier: The Early History of Tur Abdin. Cambridge University Press.
- Şayır, Mehmet (2017). Mardin Arapça Diyalekti (in Turkish). Akdem.
- Tan, Altan (2018). Turabidin'den Berriye'ye. Aşiretler - Dinler - Diller - Kültürler (in Turkish). ISBN 9789944360944.
