= Çandarlı, Midyat =

Village in Mardin Province, Turkey

Çandarlı
- Neighbourhood
- Location in Turkey
- Coordinates: 37.349°N 41.560°E
- Country: Turkey
- Province: Mardin
- District: Midyat
- Population (2021): 51
- Time zone: UTC+3 (TRT)

Çandarlı (Kurdish: Dawrîk) is a neighbourhood in the municipality and district of Midyat, Mardin Province in Turkey. The village is populated by Kurds of the Mizizex tribe and had a population of 51 in 2021.
