= Dolunay, Midyat =

Village in Mardin Province, Turkey

Dolunay
- Neighbourhood
- Location in Turkey
- Coordinates: 37.458°N 41.543°E
- Country: Turkey
- Province: Mardin
- District: Midyat
- Population (2021): 126
- Time zone: UTC+3 (TRT)

Dolunay (Kurdish: Kefzenk) is a neighbourhood in the municipality and district of Midyat, Mardin Province in Turkey. The village is populated by Kurds of the Dermemikan tribe and had a population of 126 in 2021.
