= Yenice, Midyat =

Yenice
- Neighbourhood
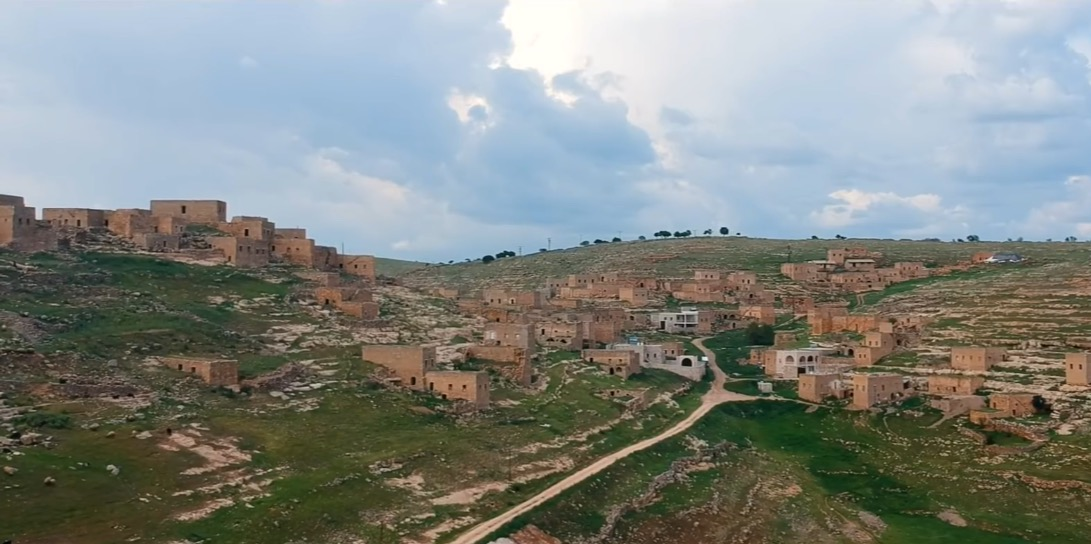

- Location within Turkey
- Coordinates: 37°22′53″N 41°28′33″E
- Country: Turkey
- Province: Mardin
- District: Midyat
- Population (2021): 54
- Time zone: UTC+3 (TRT)

Yenice (Kurdish: Xerabya/Xarabya), historically known as Harapya, is a neighbourhood located in the municipality and district of Midyat, Mardin Province in southeastern Turkey. The village is populated by Kurds who are Yazidi and had a population of 54 in 2021.

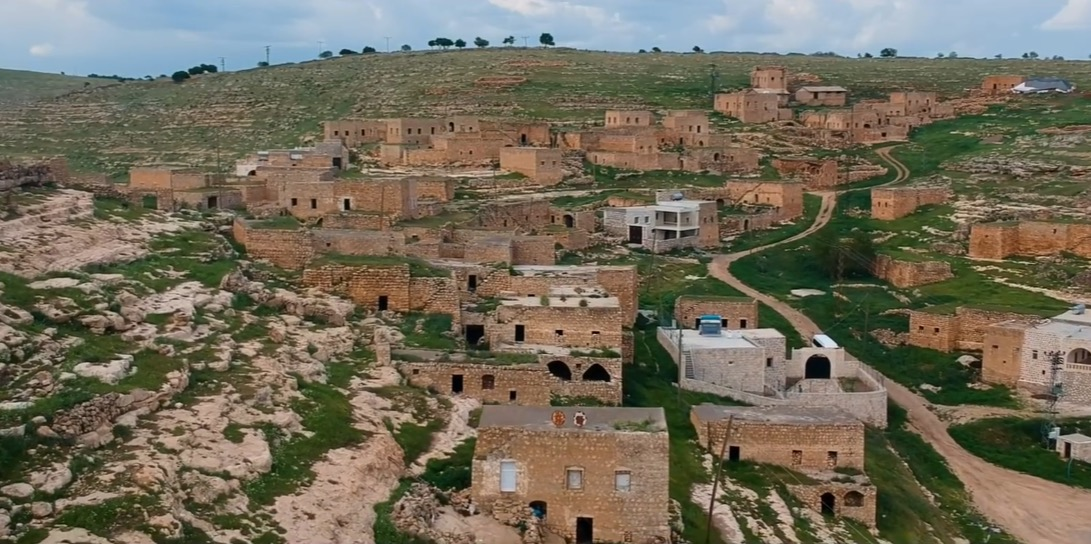
View of Yenice (2018)

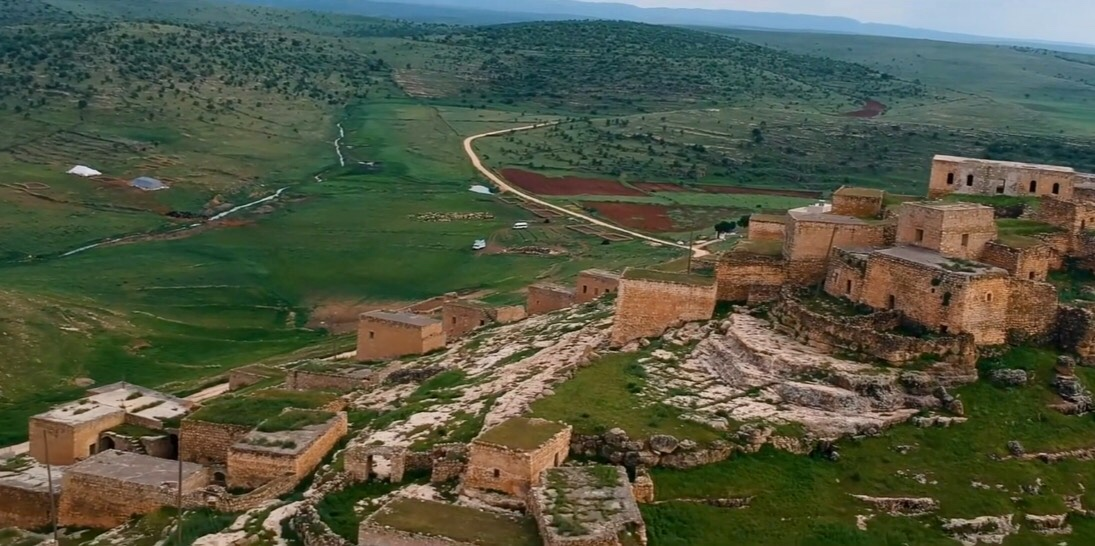
Another view of Yenice (2018)

== Population ==
Population
Year	Pop.	±% p.a.
1935	267	—
1965	372	+1.11%
2021	54	−3.39%
