= Yayvantepe, Midyat =

Village in Mardin Province, Turkey

Yayvantepe
- Neighbourhood
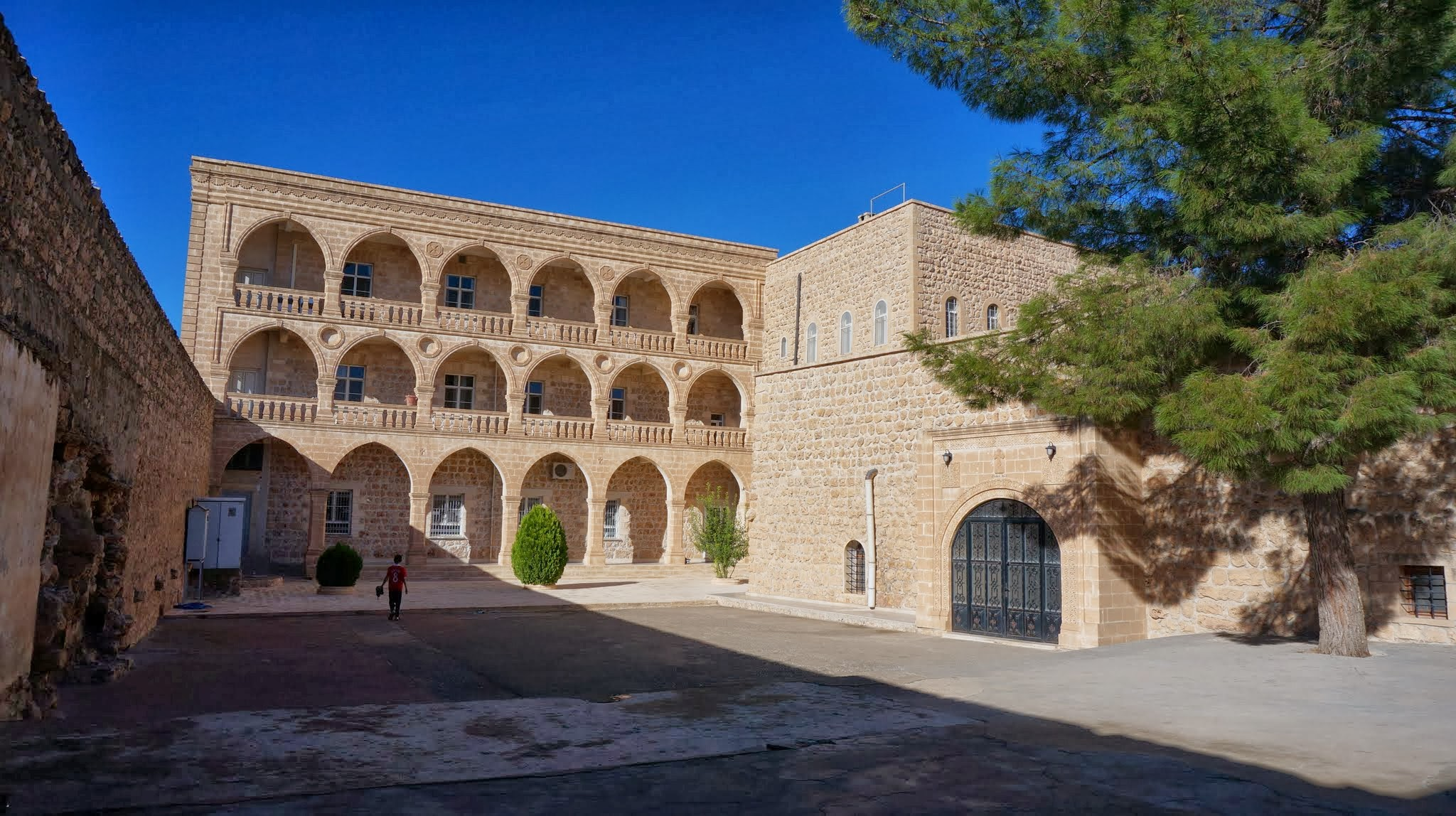
- 47500 Yayvantepe/Midyat/Mardin, Turkey

- Location within Turkey
- Coordinates: 37.299°N 41.520°E
- Country: Turkey
- Province: Mardin
- District: Midyat
- Population (2022): 977
- Time zone: UTC+3 (TRT)

Yayvantepe (Arabic: قرطمين; Kurdish: Qartmine; Syriac: ܩܪܛܡܝܢ, romanized: Qarṭmin) is a neighbourhood in the municipality and district of Midyat, Mardin Province in Turkey. The village is populated by Arabic-speaking Seyids and Kurds. It had a population of 977 in 2022. It is located in the historic region of Tur Abdin.

== History ==
Qarṭmin (today called Yayvantepe) is mentioned in the Life of Samuel, in which it is attested that Samuel of Eshtin came to the village and settled by the spring to the north. A church dedicated to the martyr Karpos, bishop of Ṣawro, was built at Qarṭmin by Ṣlivo after his son Simeon was healed through the prayers of Samuel of Eshtin in a miracle attributed to Karpos by Samuel. Samuel and Simeon consequently founded the Monastery of Qarṭmin, today known as Mor Gabriel Monastery, which is traditionally believed to have been established in AD 396/397. In the mid-fifth century, the monks of Qarṭmin fought with the villagers over possession of Simeon's relics, resulting in the death of 480 men.

== Bibliography ==
- Barsoum, Aphrem (2008). The History of Tur Abdin. Translated by Matti Moosa. Gorgias Press.
- Biner, Zerrin Özlem (2020). States of Dispossession: Violence and Precarious Coexistence in Southeast Turkey. University of Pennsylvania Press.
- Hawkins, Ernest J. W.; Mundell, Marlia C.; Mango, Cyril (1973). "The Mosaics of the Monastery of Mār Samuel, Mār Simeon, and Mār Gabriel near Kartmin with A Note on the Greek Inscription". Dumbarton Oaks Papers. 27: 279–296. doi:10.2307/1291344. JSTOR 1291344.
- Palmer, Andrew (1990). Monk and Mason on the Tigris Frontier: The Early History of Tur Abdin. Cambridge University Press.
- Tan, Altan (2018). Turabidin'den Berriye'ye. Aşiretler - Dinler - Diller - Kültürler (in Turkish). Pak Ajans Yayincilik Turizm Ve Diş Ticaret Limited şirketi. ISBN 9789944360944.
