= Ortaca, Midyat =

Village in Mardin Province, Turkey

Ortaca
- Neighbourhood
- Location in Turkey
- Coordinates: 37.474°N 41.556°E
- Country: Turkey
- Province: Mardin
- District: Midyat
- Population (2021): 747
- Time zone: UTC+3 (TRT)

Ortaca (Kurdish: Heşterek; Syriac: Eshtrākō) (Note: Alternatively transliterated as Eštrākū, Estrako, Heshtarke, Heshtarko, Hesterek, Heshterek, Ishatarko, Ishtarkao, Ishtarko, Ştrāko, or Shterako. Nisba: Ştrākōyo. Also known as Ashtarka or Ashtarak ("tower" in Armenian).) is a neighbourhood in the municipality and district of Midyat, Mardin Province in Turkey. The village is populated by Syriacs and by Kurds of the Elîkan tribe and had a population of 747 in 2021. It is located in the historic region of Tur Abdin.

== History ==
The Church of Mar Addai at Eshtrākō (today called Ortaca) has been dated to the first century AD. According to an inscription at the Church of Mar Addai, the church and/or the outdoor oratory (Syriac: beth ṣlutho) was constructed in 771/772 (AG 1083). The monk Musa of Eshtrākō is named amongst those who were killed in the Cave of Ibn Siqi by the soldiers of Timur in 1394. The village was attacked by Turks in 1405. In 1454 (AG 1765), many men from the village were suffocated to death by smoke by Turks of the clan of Hasan Beg, as per the account of the priest Addai of Basibrina in c. 1500 appended to the Chronography of Bar Hebraeus. Turks attacked Eshtrākō again in 1535 and 1555.

The village became the seat of a Kurdish agha in the nineteenth century. In the Syriac Orthodox patriarchal register of dues of 1870, it was recorded that Eshtrākō had three households, who paid ten dues, and did not have a priest. There were 20 Syriac families and 200 Kurdish families in 1915. The Syriacs adhered to the Syriac Orthodox Church. Amidst the Sayfo, on 3 July 1915, most of the village's Syriac population was massacred by their Kurdish neighbours and only twelve survivors managed to get to Hah. The Church of Mar Addai was converted into a mosque. In 1960, the village had a population of 858. In 1966, there were 25 Turoyo-speaking Christians in four families at Eshtrākō.

== Demography ==
The following is a list of the number of Syriac Orthodox families that have inhabited Eshtrākō per year stated. Unless otherwise stated, all figures are from the list provided in The Syrian Orthodox Christians in the Late Ottoman Period and Beyond: Crisis then Revival, as noted in the bibliography below.

- 1915: 20
- 1966: 4
- 1978: 2
- 1979: 0

== Bibliography ==
- Barsoum, Aphrem (2008). The History of Tur Abdin. Translated by Matti Moosa. Gorgias Press.
- Bell, Gertrude (1982). The Churches and Monasteries of the Ṭur ʻAbdin. Pindar Press.
- Bcheiry, Iskandar (2009). The Syriac Orthodox Patriarchal Register of Dues of 1870: An Unpublished Historical Document from the Late Ottoman Period. Gorgias Press.
- Courtois, Sébastien de (2004). The Forgotten Genocide: Eastern Christians, The Last Arameans. Translated by Vincent Aurora. Gorgias Press.
- Dinno, Khalid S. (2017). The Syrian Orthodox Christians in the Late Ottoman Period and Beyond: Crisis then Revival. Gorgias Press.
- Gaunt, David (2006). Massacres, Resistance, Protectors: Muslim-Christian Relations in Eastern Anatolia during World War I. Gorgias Press.
- Jongerden, Joost; Verheij, Jelle, eds. (2012). Social Relations in Ottoman Diyarbekir, 1870-1915. Brill.
- Keser-Kayaalp, Elif (2019). "Church Building in the Ṭur 'Abdin in the First Centuries of the Islamic Rule". In Alain Delattre; Marie Legendre; Petra Sijpesteijn (eds.). Authority and Control in the Countryside: From Antiquity to Islam in the Mediterranean and Near East (Sixth-Tenth Century). Leiden-Boston: Brill. pp. 176–209. ISBN 9789004386549.
- Palmer, Andrew (1990). Monk and Mason on the Tigris Frontier: The Early History of Tur Abdin. Cambridge University Press.
- Ritter, Hellmut (1967). Turoyo: Die Volkssprache der Syrischen Christen des Tur 'Abdin (in German). Vol. 1. Franz Steiner Verlag.
- Tan, Altan (2018). Turabidin'den Berriye'ye. Aşiretler - Dinler - Diller - Kültürler (in Turkish). Pak Ajans Yayincilik Turizm Ve Diş Ticaret Limited şirketi. ISBN 9789944360944.
