= Çavuşlu, Midyat =

Village in Mardin Province, Turkey

Çavuşlu
- Neighbourhood
- Location in Turkey
- Coordinates: 37.501°N 41.250°E
- Country: Turkey
- Province: Mardin
- District: Midyat
- Population (2022): 2,836
- Time zone: UTC+3 (TRT)

Çavuşlu (Kurdish: Şorizbah; Syriac: ܫܳܪܶܙܒܰܚ, romanized: Shorezbah) is a neighbourhood of the municipality and district of Midyat, Mardin Province, Turkey. Its population is 2,836 (2022). Before the 2013 reorganisation, it was a town (belde). The village is populated by Kurds of the Kercoz tribe and by the Mhallami.

== History ==
Çavuşlu is a former Assyrian settlement that is mainly populated by the Mhallami with some Kurdish families. The history of Shorezbah dates back to the earliest settlements in the region, which date to the third century BC. Due to its central location in the eastern Mhalmayto region, Shorezbah became a place where Syriac christian leaders from surrounding villages would gather to discuss matters of mutual concern, particularly in times of danger or when disputes arose between villages. It is believed that the decision for mass conversion to Islam, in order to protect their children from the wrath of Nasuh Pasha, was likely made in Shorezbah.

The village has experienced a population loss in recent years due to economic migration.

Historical population
Year	Pop.	±% p.a.
1985	3,677	—
1990	3,437	−1.34%
1997	7,249	+11.25%
2000	8,555	+5.68%
2007	7,940	−1.06%
2012	4,292	−11.58%
2017	3,460	−4.22%
2022	2,836	−3.90%
Source: 1985 census, 1990 census, 1997 census, 2000 census and TÜIK (2007-2022)
