= Gülveren, Midyat =

Village in Mardin Province, Turkey

Gülveren
- Neighbourhood
- Location in Turkey
- Coordinates: 37.489°N 41.496°E
- Country: Turkey
- Province: Mardin
- District: Midyat
- Population (2021): 668
- Time zone: UTC+3 (TRT)

Gülveren (Kurdish: Behwar; Syriac: Baḥwar) (Note: Alternatively transliterated as Bahvar, Bahwār, or Behvoir.) is a neighbourhood in the municipality and district of Midyat, Mardin Province in Turkey. The village is populated by Kurds of the Dermemikan tribe and had a population of 668 in 2021. It is located in the historic region of Tur Abdin.

== History ==
Baḥwar (today called Gülveren) was historically inhabited by Syriac Orthodox Christians. In the Syriac Orthodox patriarchal register of dues of 1870, it was recorded that the village had 4 households, who did not pay any dues, and did not have a church or a priest. In 1914, there were 100 Syriacs in the village, according to the list presented to the Paris Peace Conference by the Assyro-Chaldean delegation.

== Bibliography ==
- Bcheiry, Iskandar (2009). The Syriac Orthodox Patriarchal Register of Dues of 1870: An Unpublished Historical Document from the Late Ottoman Period. Gorgias Press.
- Gaunt, David (2006). Massacres, Resistance, Protectors: Muslim-Christian Relations in Eastern Anatolia during World War I. Gorgias Press.
- Jongerden, Joost; Verheij, Jelle, eds. (2012). Social Relations in Ottoman Diyarbekir, 1870-1915. Brill.
- Palmer, Andrew (1990). Monk and Mason on the Tigris Frontier: The Early History of Tur Abdin. Cambridge University Press.
- Tan, Altan (2018). Turabidin'den Berriye'ye. Aşiretler - Dinler - Diller - Kültürler (in Turkish). Pak Ajans Yayincilik Turizm Ve Diş Ticaret Limited şirketi. ISBN 9789944360944.
