= İkizdere, Midyat =

Village in Mardin Province, Turkey

İkizdere
- Neighbourhood
- Location in Turkey
- Coordinates: 37.412°N 41.541°E
- Country: Turkey
- Province: Mardin
- District: Midyat
- Population (2021): 61
- Time zone: UTC+3 (TRT)

İkizdere (Kurdish: Duben) is a neighbourhood in the municipality and district of Midyat, Mardin Province in Turkey. The village is populated by Kurds of the Çomeran tribe and had a population of 61 in 2021.
