= Abai (martyr) =

Religious figure of the Syriac Orthodox Church

- Died: 363
- Venerated in: Syriac Orthodox Church
- Feast: October 1

Abai was a martyr in Syria. He was killed during the reign of Shapur II. He is a saint in the Syriac Orthodox Church and his feast day is October 1. He is included in Kalendarium Manuale Utriusque Ecclesiae Orientalis et Occidentalis. He had been killed by his father Adorpirozgerd who later became a Christian. He was killed together with other 5000 martyrs including his mother Astina (Hwarta). He was mentioned in the legend of Sābā Pirgushnasp, a child martyr, who had been a son of the governor of Beth ʿArabaye and had been killed under the Shapur II. Approximately the years of his life are 335-385 AD.

Abai is not to be confused with the Syriac saint Abhai.
