= Pelitli, Midyat =

Village in Mardin Province, Turkey

Pelitli
- Neighbourhood
- Location in Turkey
- Coordinates: 37.332°N 41.400°E
- Country: Turkey
- Province: Mardin
- District: Midyat
- Population (2021): 311
- Time zone: UTC+3 (TRT)

Pelitli (Arabic: بربونس, romanized: Barbunis) is a neighbourhood in the municipality and district of Midyat, Mardin Province in Turkey. The village is populated by Arabs and had a population of 311 in 2021.
