= Erişti, Midyat =

Village in Mardin Province, Turkey

Erişti
- Neighbourhood
- Location in Turkey
- Coordinates: 37°30′09″N 41°17′38″E
- Country: Turkey
- Province: Mardin
- District: Midyat
- Population (2021): 329
- Time zone: UTC+3 (TRT)

Erişti or Tafo is a neighbourhood in the municipality and district of Midyat, Mardin Province in Turkey. The village is populated by the Mhallami and had a population of 329 in 2021.
