= Yuvalı, Midyat =

Village in Mardin Province, Turkey

Yuvalı
- Neighbourhood
- Location in Turkey
- Coordinates: 37.465°N 41.657°E
- Country: Turkey
- Province: Mardin
- District: Midyat
- Population (2021): 103
- Time zone: UTC+3 (TRT)

Yuvalı (Kurdish: Xerabê Hurîya) is a neighbourhood in the municipality and district of Midyat, Mardin Province in Turkey. The village is populated by Kurds of the Zaxuran tribe and had a population of 103 in 2021.
