= Kayabaşı, Midyat =

Village in Mardin Province, Turkey

Kayabaşı
- Neighbourhood
- Location in Turkey
- Coordinates: 37.365°N 41.205°E
- Country: Turkey
- Province: Mardin
- District: Midyat
- Population (2021): 103
- Time zone: UTC+3 (TRT)

Kayabaşı (Kurdish: Şakolin) is a neighbourhood in the municipality and district of Midyat, Mardin Province in Turkey. The village is populated by Kurds of the Omerkan tribe and had a population of 103 in 2021.
