= Martyrology of Rabban Sliba =

Syriac Orthodox martyrology

The Martyrology of Rabban Sliba is a book containing the names and feast days of a number of martyrs of the Syriac Orthodox Church.

The book was composed by the monk Rabban Sliba in the late thirteenth century or early fourteenth century. It was edited by Paul Peeters, S.J., and published in Analecta Bollandiana #27 in 1908. It is one of the most important resources for the study of Syriac hagiography.

== Saints included ==
Aaron the Illustrious was a Christian monk of Mesopotamia from the 4th century. He came from Sarug in Osrhoene and was a disciple of Saint Eugene. He built two monasteries near Melitene in Armenia in the 4th century. He had a feast day on Pentecost Monday in the Syriac Orthodox Church, and on February 3, October 22, and May 23.

Saint Abel (Syrian) is a saint of the Syriac Orthodox Church. He is considered the patron saint of the blind and the lame. His feast day is celebrated on August 2. It has been argued that he may be the same person as Saint Rubin.

Mar Abhai (also known as Abhai), from the land of Gargar is a saint of the Syriac Orthodox Church. His feast day is June 26.

Abhai of Hah was an abbot of the monastery of Qartmin in Byzantine Syria. He is a saint of the Syriac Orthodox Church, with a feast day of November 18.

Abhai (saint) is a saint of the Syriac Orthodox Church. He is said to have lived for 100 years. He is a patron saint against poisonous reptiles. His feast day is celebrated on July 15 and May 3. Saint Abhai is not to be confused with the 4th-century Syriac martyr Abai.

Abhai (teacher) was the instructor or teacher of Abhai the general. He is regarded as a saint, and his feast day is November 1.
