= Mardin Museum =

- Mardin Müzesi
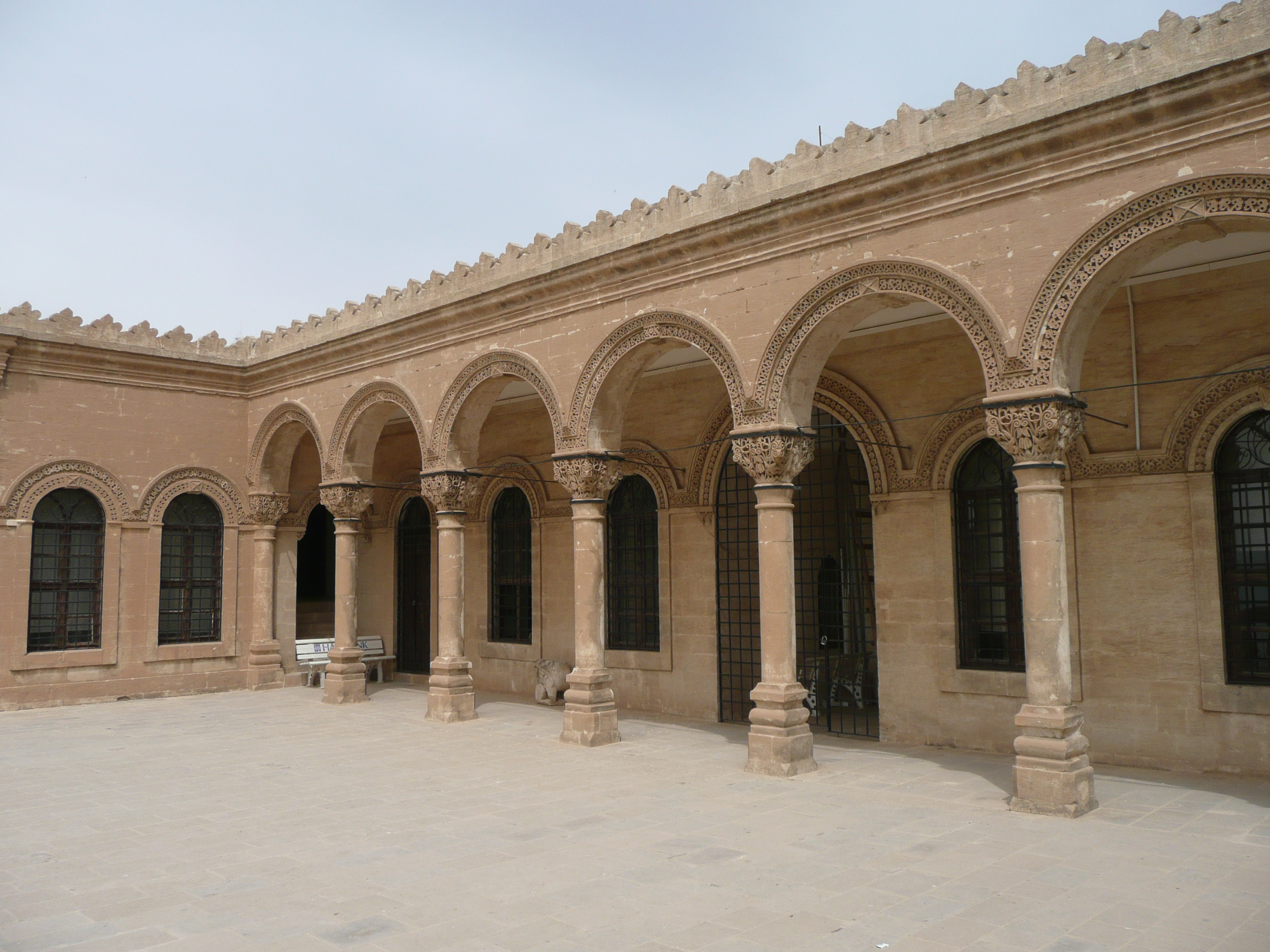

- Mardin Museum
- Established: 2000; 26 years ago
- Coordinates: 37°18′49″N 40°04′05″E
- Type: Archaeology, Ethnography
- Collections: Bronze Age, Syriac, Urartu, Hellenistic, Achaemenid Empire, Roman Empire, Byzantine Empire, Seljuks, Artukids and the Ottoman Empire
- Owner: Ministry of Culture

Mardin Museum is a museum in Mardin, Turkey

== Location and history ==
The museum is to the north of the Cumhuriyet Street at 37°18′49″N 40°4′05″E.

The former museum of Mardin was in Zincirli Medrese, a building constructed by the Artukids in the 14th century. The present museum was opened in 1995.

The museum building was constructed by the Syriac Catholic Church of Antioch in 1895. In the 20th century besides being a religious office, the building was used for various services. The Ministry of Culture purchased the building and after restoration it was opened as a museum in 1995 .

The building was made of cut limestone. There are unique ornaments on the internal and external vaults, arches, rails and column heads. It is a three-storey building. Reception, conference, exhibition and resting halls are in the ground floor. The ethnography hall and library are in the upper floor. The uppermost floor is reserved for administrative offices and the archaeology section.

== Exhibited items ==
Mardin area and especially Midyat ilçe (district) is known for silver works In the ethnography hall, necklaces, earrings, bracelets, anklets, diadems, hair jewelry and copper and silver ornaments are exhibited. There are also clothes, swords, prayer beads, and coffee sets (locally known as mırra).

In the archaeological halls, tools from old Bronze Age, Assyrian, Urartu, Hellenistic, Achaemenid Empire, Roman Empire, Byzantine Empire, Seljuks, Artukids and the Ottoman Empire are exhibited. These are stamps, figurines, jewelry, ceramics, coins, tear bottles, candles etc.
