= Toptepe, Midyat =

Village in Mardin Province, Turkey

Toptepe
- Neighbourhood
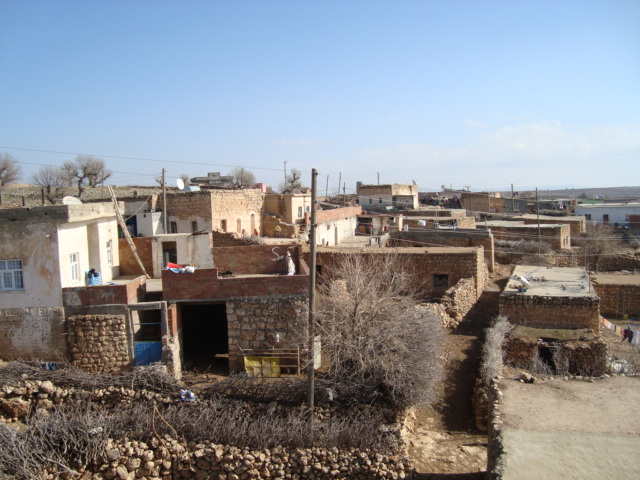

- Location within Turkey
- Coordinates: 37.261°N 41.248°E
- Country: Turkey
- Province: Mardin
- District: Midyat
- Population (2021): 1,108
- Time zone: UTC+3 (TRT)

Toptepe (Kurdish: Nibilê) is a neighbourhood in the municipality and district of Midyat, Mardin Province in Turkey. The village is populated by Kurds of the Elîkan tribe and had a population of 1,108 in 2021.
