= Çayırlı, Midyat =

Çayırlı
- Neighbourhood
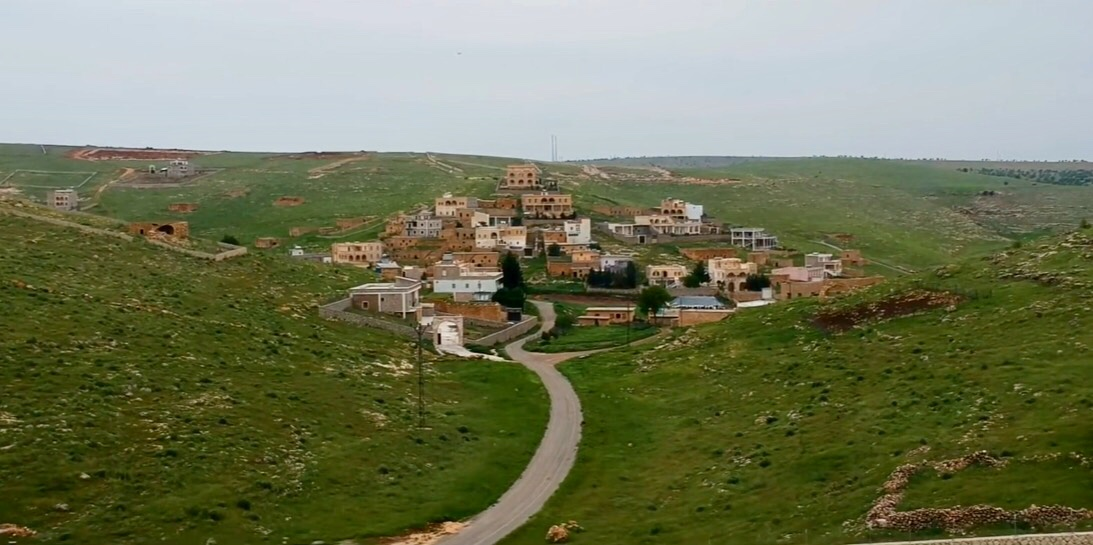

- Location within Turkey
- Coordinates: 37°19′55″N 41°27′23″E
- Country: Turkey
- Province: Mardin
- District: Midyat
- Population (2021): 254
- Time zone: UTC+3 (TRT)

Çayırlı (Kurdish: Kefnas) is a neighbourhood located in the municipality and district of Midyat, Mardin Province in Turkey. The village is populated by Kurds of the Botikan tribe and had a population of 254 as of 2021.

The village is Yazidi.

The settlement of Derebaşı (Koçan) is a hamlet of Çayırlı and is also populated by Kurds of the Botikan tribe who adhere to Yazidism.

== History ==
In March 1879, British officer Trotter visited the village and described the village as "a large village abandoned and in ruins, evidently quite recently deserted". The village was seemingly plundered and burned by the Ottomans and the villagers had fled to the mountains with their chief while others settled in Meziza.

In 2014, a Bundestag report stated that refugees from the village had difficulties returning to the village by paramilitary and Islamic-fundamentalistic groups.

== Location ==
Kefnas is located ca. 2 kilometres (1.2 mi) east of the Yazidi village Koçan and ca. 2 kilometres (1.2 mi) northeast of the Yazidi village Denwan.

== Population ==
Population
Year	Pop.	±%
1935	205	—
1965	625	+204.9%
1973	844	+35.0%
1985	1,184	+40.3%
2000	0	−100.0%
2021	254	—
