= Yolbaşı, Midyat =

Village in Mardin Province, Turkey

Yolbaşı
- Neighbourhood
- Location in Turkey
- Coordinates: 37.386°N 41.317°E
- Country: Turkey
- Province: Mardin
- District: Midyat
- Population (2022): 3,187
- Time zone: UTC+3 (TRT)

Yolbaşı (Arabic: كفر علاب, romanized: Keferallab; Kurdish: Kefşerin; Syriac: Kfar ʿAllab) (Note: Also spelt as Kafar Allab.) is a neighbourhood of the municipality and district of Midyat, Mardin Province, Turkey. Its population is 3,187 (2022). Before the 2013 reorganisation, it was a town (belde). The village is populated by Kurds and the Mhallami. It is located in the historic region of Bēth Muḥallam in Tur Abdin.

== History ==
Kfar ʿAllab (today called Yolbaşı) was historically inhabited by Syriac Christians and Jews. The Christians converted to Islam alongside the other Mhallami villages in c. 1583 to escape persecution. The village mosque is believed to have previously been a church.

== Bibliography ==
- Barsoum, Aphrem (2008). The History of Tur Abdin. Translated by Matti Moosa. Gorgias Press.
- İşler, İbrahim, ed. (2018). Midyat'ta Konuşulan Muhallemi Lehçesi: Arapça-Türkçe Sözlük (in Turkish). Mevsimler.
- Palmer, Andrew (1990). Monk and Mason on the Tigris Frontier: The Early History of Tur Abdin. Cambridge University Press.
- Tan, Altan (2018). Turabidin'den Berriye'ye. Aşiretler - Dinler - Diller - Kültürler (in Turkish). ISBN 9789944360944.
