= Düzoba, Midyat =

Village in Mardin Province, Turkey

Düzoba
- Neighbourhood
- Location in Turkey
- Coordinates: 37.392°N 41.273°E
- Country: Turkey
- Province: Mardin
- District: Midyat
- Population (2021): 511
- Time zone: UTC+3 (TRT)

Düzoba (Arabic: ریش, romanized: Riş) is a neighbourhood in the municipality and district of Midyat, Mardin Province in Turkey. The village is populated by the Mhallami and had a population of 511 in 2021.
