= Çamyurt, Midyat =

Village in Mardin Province, Turkey

Çamyurt
- Neighbourhood
- Location in Turkey
- Coordinates: 37.412°N 41.109°E
- Country: Turkey
- Province: Mardin
- District: Midyat
- Population (2021): 188
- Time zone: UTC+3 (TRT)

Çamyurt (Kurdish: Mesken) is a neighbourhood in the municipality and district of Midyat, Mardin Province in Turkey. The village is populated by Kurds of the Omerkan tribe and had a population of 188 in 2021.
