= Ziyaret, Midyat =

Village in Mardin Province, Turkey

Ziyaret
- Neighbourhood
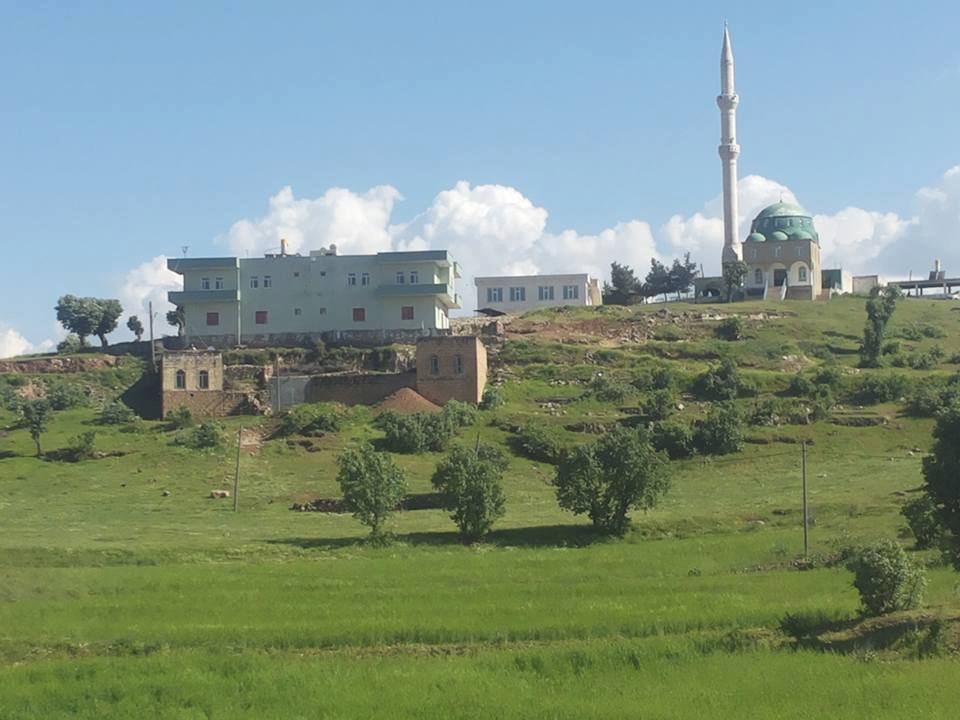

- Location within Turkey
- Coordinates: 37.463°N 41.087°E
- Country: Turkey
- Province: Mardin
- District: Midyat
- Population (2021): 161
- Time zone: UTC+3 (TRT)

Ziyaret is a neighbourhood in the municipality and district of Midyat, Mardin Province in Turkey. The village is populated by the Mhallami and had a population of 161 in 2021.
