= Doğanyazı, Midyat =

Village in Mardin Province, Turkey

Doğanyazı
- Neighbourhood
- Location in Turkey
- Coordinates: 37.412°N 41.584°E
- Country: Turkey
- Province: Mardin
- District: Midyat
- Population (2021): 157
- Time zone: UTC+3 (TRT)

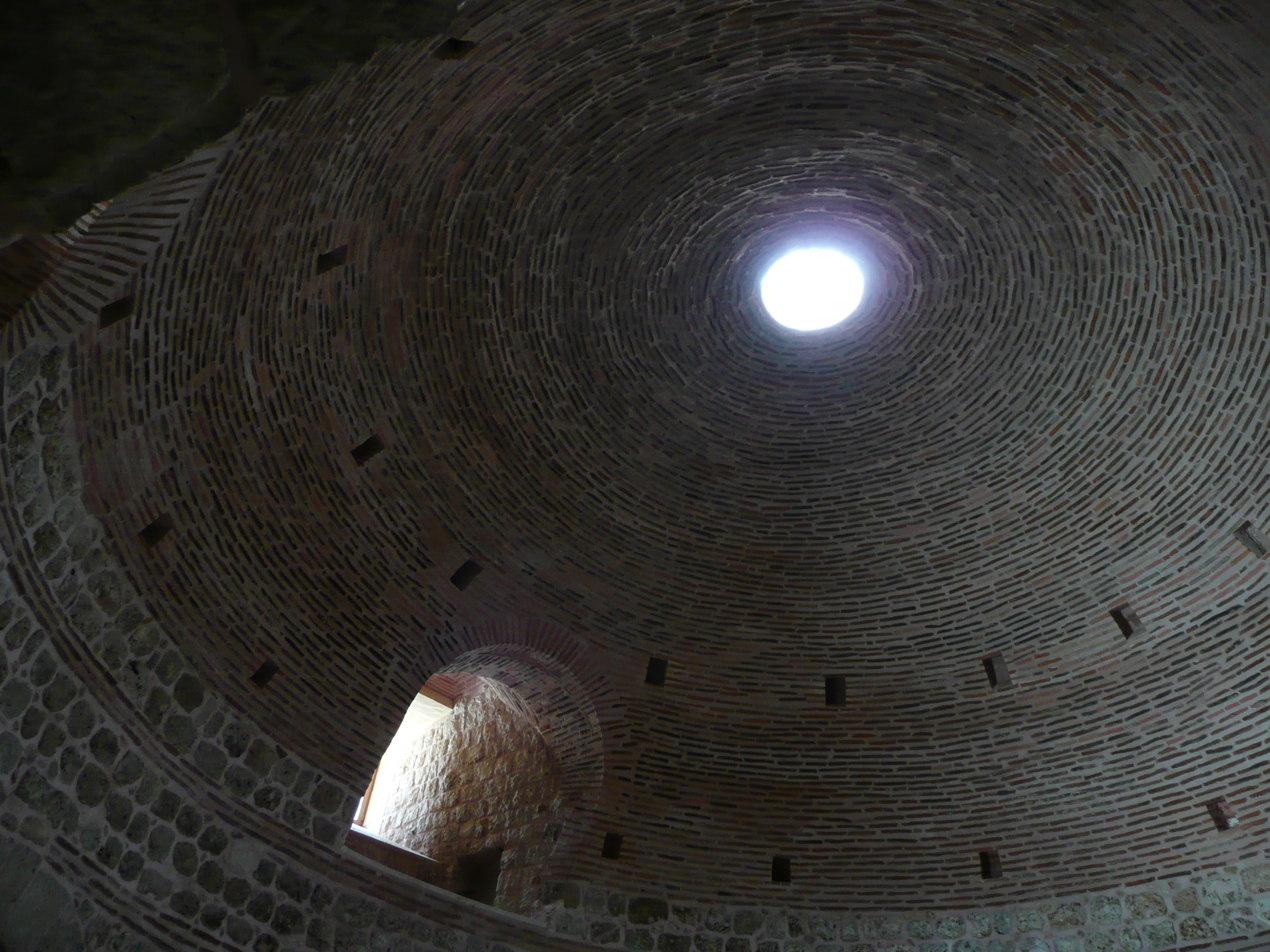
Photo from Deyrulumur in Doğanyazı, Midyat, Turkey

Doğanyazı (Kurdish: Pîrkan) is a neighbourhood in the municipality and district of Midyat, Mardin Province in Turkey. The village is populated by Kurds of the Çomeran and Dermemikan tribes and had a population of 157 in 2021.
