= Sivrice, Midyat =

Village in Mardin Province, Turkey

Sivrice
- Neighbourhood
- Location in Turkey
- Coordinates: 37.276°N 41.336°E
- Country: Turkey
- Province: Mardin
- District: Midyat
- Population (2021): 1,633
- Time zone: UTC+3 (TRT)

Sivrice (Kurdish: Dalîn) is a neighbourhood in the municipality and district of Midyat, Mardin Province in Turkey. The village is populated by Kurds of the Şemikan tribe and had a population of 1,633 in 2021.
