= Hanlar, Midyat =

Village in Mardin Province, Turkey

Yeşilöz
- Neighbourhood
- Location within Turkey
- Coordinates: 37.453°N 41.579°E
- Country: Turkey
- Province: Mardin
- District: Midyat
- Population (2021): 235
- Time zone: UTC+3 (TRT)

Hanlar (Kurdish: Xanika) is a neighbourhood in the municipality and district of Midyat, Mardin Province in Turkey. The village is populated by Kurds of the Dermemikan tribe and had a population of 235 in 2021.
