= Kayalıpınar, Midyat =

Village in Mardin Province, Turkey

Kayalıpınar
- Neighbourhood
- Location in Turkey
- Coordinates: 37.331°N 41.226°E
- Country: Turkey
- Province: Mardin
- District: Midyat
- Population (2021): 1,279
- Time zone: UTC+3 (TRT)

Kayalıpınar (Kurdish: Mikrê) is a neighbourhood in the municipality and district of Midyat, Mardin Province in Turkey. The village is populated by Kurds of the Elîkan tribe and had a population of 1,279 in 2021.
