= Taşlıburç, Midyat =

Village in Mardin Province, Turkey

Taşlıburç
- Neighbourhood
- Location in Turkey
- Coordinates: 37.185°N 41.278°E
- Country: Turkey
- Province: Mardin
- District: Midyat
- Population (2021): 62
- Time zone: UTC+3 (TRT)

Taşlıburç (Kurdish: Kelehkê, Kelehka Şêx Ehmed) is a neighbourhood in the municipality and district of Midyat, Mardin Province in Turkey. The village is populated by Kurds of the Koçekan tribe and had a population of 62 in 2021.
