= Narlı, Midyat =

Village in Mardin Province, Turkey

Narlı
- Neighbourhood
- Location within Turkey
- Coordinates: 37.458°N 41.486°E
- Country: Turkey
- Province: Mardin
- District: Midyat
- Population (2021): 387
- Time zone: UTC+3 (TRT)

Narlı (Kurdish: Helax; (Note: Also spelt as Helexe.) Syriac: Aḥlaḥ) (Note: Alternatively transliterated as Achlah, Âhlah, Ahlah, Halah, or Ḥalāḥ. Nisba: Halaxī.) is a neighbourhood in the municipality and district of Midyat, Mardin Province in Turkey. The village is populated by Syriacs and by Kurds of the Dermemikan tribe and had a population of 387 in 2021. It is located in the historic region of Tur Abdin.

== History ==
Aḥlaḥ (today called Narlı) was inhabited by three or four Syriac families in 1915. The Syriacs adhered to the Syriac Orthodox Church. Amidst the Sayfo, the Syriacs of Aḥlaḥ were protected by their Kurdish neighbours. Some Syriacs who took refuge at ‘Ayn-Wardo were shot as they attempted to return to their village. The population of the village was 984 in 1960. There were 30 Kurdish-speaking Christians in five families in 1966. By 1987, there were no remaining Syriacs.

== Demography ==
The following is a list of the number of Syriac families that have inhabited Aḥlaḥ per year stated. Unless otherwise stated, all figures are from the list provided in The Syrian Orthodox Christians in the Late Ottoman Period and Beyond: Crisis then Revival, as noted in the bibliography below.

- 1915: 3–4
- 1966: 5
- 1978: 5
- 1979: 3
- 1981: 3
- 1987: 0

== Bibliography ==
- Biner, Zerrin Özlem (2020). States of Dispossession: Violence and Precarious Coexistence in Southeast Turkey. University of Pennsylvania Press.
- Courtois, Sébastien de (2004). The Forgotten Genocide: Eastern Christians, The Last Arameans. Translated by Vincent Aurora. Gorgias Press.
- Dinno, Khalid S. (2017). The Syrian Orthodox Christians in the Late Ottoman Period and Beyond: Crisis then Revival. Gorgias Press.
- Gaunt, David (2006). Massacres, Resistance, Protectors: Muslim-Christian Relations in Eastern Anatolia during World War I. Gorgias Press.
- Jongerden, Joost; Verheij, Jelle, eds. (2012). Social Relations in Ottoman Diyarbekir, 1870-1915. Brill.
- Palmer, Andrew (1990). Monk and Mason on the Tigris Frontier: The Early History of Tur Abdin. Cambridge University Press.
- Ritter, Hellmut (1967). Turoyo: Die Volkssprache der Syrischen Christen des Tur 'Abdin (in German). Vol. 1. Franz Steiner Verlag.
- Tan, Altan (2018). Turabidin'den Berriye'ye. Aşiretler - Dinler - Diller - Kültürler (in Turkish). Pak Ajans Yayincilik Turizm Ve Diş Ticaret Limited şirketi. ISBN 9789944360944.
- Travis, Hannibal, ed. (2018). The Assyrian Genocide: Cultural and Political Legacies (PDF). Routledge.
