= Acırlı, Midyat =

Village in Mardin Province, Turkey

Acırlı
- Neighbourhood
- Location within Turkey
- Coordinates: 37.455°N 41.297°E
- Country: Turkey
- Province: Mardin
- District: Midyat
- Population (2022): 3,069
- Time zone: UTC+3 (TRT)

Acırlı (Kurdish: Derizbîn; Syriac: ܡܪܝ ܙܒܝܢܐ, romanized: Dayrozbino) (Note: Alternatively transliterated as Dayro-Zwino, Dayr Eusebena (Zabina), or Derizbin.) is a neighbourhood of the municipality and district of Midyat, Mardin Province, Turkey. Its population is 3,069 (2022). Before the 2013 reorganisation, it was a town (belde). The village is populated by Kurds of the Kercoz tribe and Mhallami. It is located in the historic region of Bēth Muḥallam in Tur Abdin.

== History ==
Dayro Zbino (today called Acırlı) was previously the site of the Monastery of Mar Zbina, mentioned in the Life of Simeon of the Olives. It has been suggested that it may be identified with the Monastery of Zebinus in the Roman province of Mesopotamia, which was restored by Emperor Justinian I (r. 527–565) as per Procopius in On Buildings. The village developed around the monastery and was historically inhabited by Syriac Christians who converted to Islam in c. 1583 to escape persecution. The mosque at Derizbin was constructed on the site of the church.

== Bibliography ==
- Barsoum, Aphrem (2008). The History of Tur Abdin. Translated by Matti Moosa. Gorgias Press.
- Bell, Gertrude (1982). The Churches and Monasteries of the Ṭur ʻAbdin. Pindar Press.
- Gaunt, David (2006). Massacres, Resistance, Protectors: Muslim-Christian Relations in Eastern Anatolia during World War I. Gorgias Press.
- Palmer, Andrew (1990). Monk and Mason on the Tigris Frontier: The Early History of Tur Abdin. Cambridge University Press.
- Keser Kayaalp, Elif (2021). Church Architecture of Late Antique Northern Mesopotamia. Oxford University Press.
- Sinclair, T. A (1989). Eastern Turkey: An Architectural & Archaeological Survey. Vol. III. Pindar Press.
- Tan, Altan (2018). Turabidin'den Berriye'ye. Aşiretler - Dinler - Diller - Kültürler (in Turkish). Pak Ajans Yayincilik Turizm Ve Diş Ticaret Limited şirketi. ISBN 9789944360944.
