= Saint Rubin =

Rubin is a saint of the Syriac Orthodox church. He was a stylite of Kartamin. He is commemorated with feast days of August 1 and August 4.

== See also ==
- Hermit
- Simeon Stylites
- Oriental Orthodoxy
- Eastern Orthodoxy
- Eastern Catholicism
