= Abhai the general =

Saint and martyr

Abhai the general or Abhai Mihrsabor

Martyrs
- Venerated in: Syriac Orthodox Church
- Feast: October 1

Abhai the general (or Abhai Mihrsabor) is a Christian saint and a martyr.

He was killed by his father Aduzphiruzgerd. His mother is Astina. His relics are located at Killith monastery in Mesopotamia, where he had served as abbot. His feast day is October 1 in the Syriac Orthodox Church.

== Sources ==
- Holweck, F. G. A Biographical Dictionary of the Saints. St. Louis, Missouri, US: B. Herder Book Co., 1924.
