= Midyat =

- District and municipality
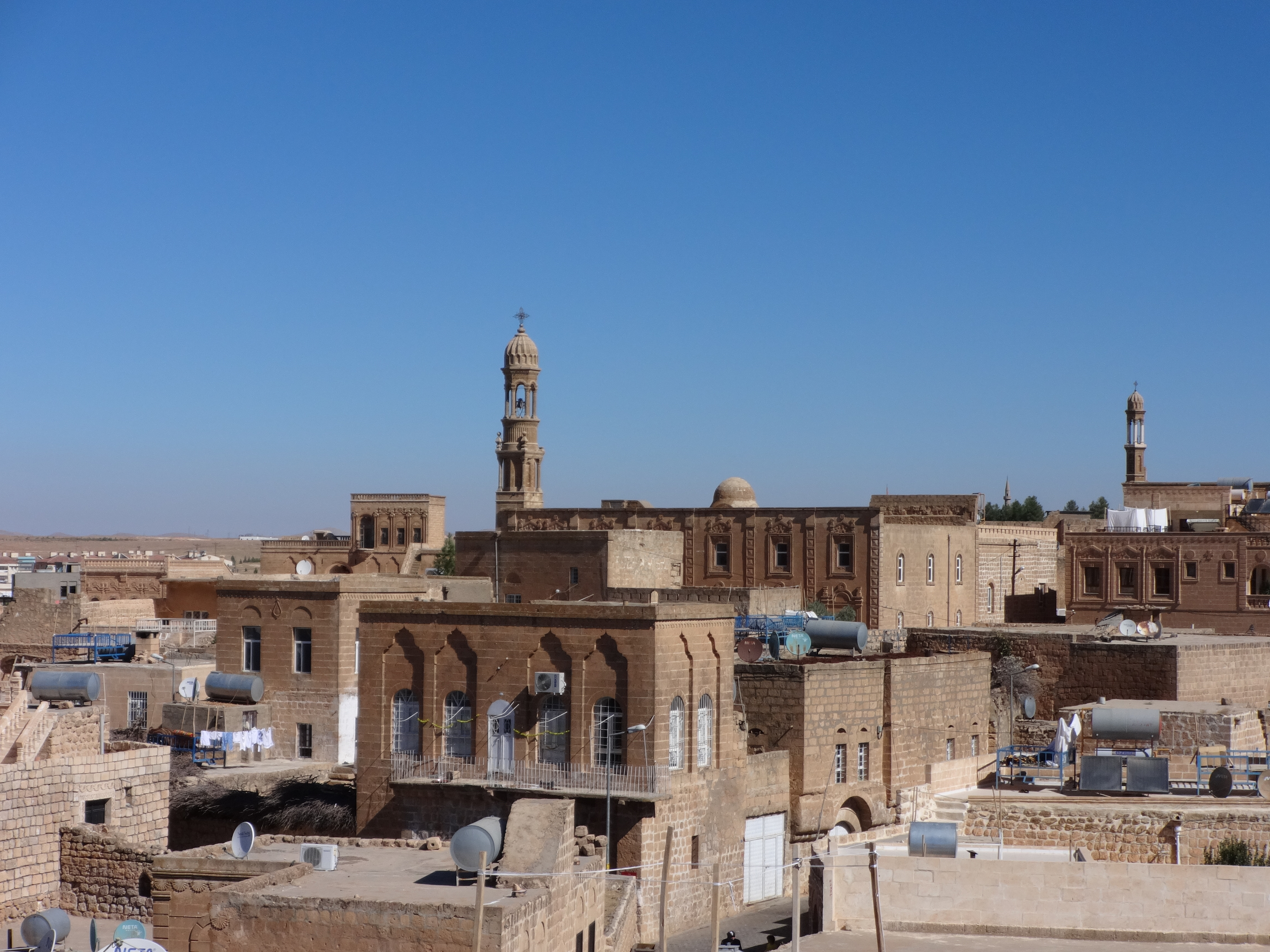
- View of the old town of Midyat

- Logo

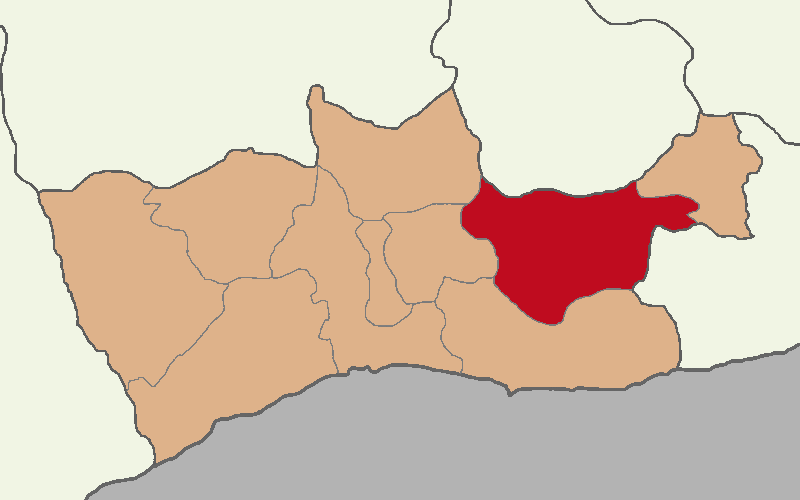
- Map showing Midyat District in Mardin Province

- Location within Turkey
- Coordinates: 37°25′00″N 41°22′11″E
- Country: Turkey
- Province: Mardin

Government
  - Mayor: Veysi Şahin (AKP)
- Area: 1,241 km^{2} (479 sq mi)
- Elevation: 953 m (3,127 ft)
- Population (2022): 120,069
  - Density: 96.75/km^{2} (250.6/sq mi)
- Time zone: UTC+3 (TRT)
- Area code: 0482
- Website: www.midyat.bel.tr

Midyat (Syriac: ܡܕܝܕ, romanized: Mëḏyaḏ, Kurdish: Midyad, Arabic: مديات) is a municipality and district of Mardin Province, Turkey. Its area is 1,241 km^{2}, and its population is 120,069 (2022).

The town is populated by Kurds, Mhallami and Assyrians. The Estel neighborhood is about 80 to 85% Kurdish-populated.

Midyat was originally made up of mostly Syriac Orthodox, Catholic, and Protestant Christians. The spoken language of Midyat was until recently modern Aramaic (Surayt) and the town has throughout history been considered the capital of the Tur Abdin region, the heartland of Syriac Christianity.

== History ==
Assyrian tablets from 9th century BC refer to Midyat as Matiate. During a campaign in 879 BC, the Assyrian king Assurnasirpal II and his army marched through the city, staying for two nights. His successor, the Assyrian king Shalmaneser III did the same in 845 BC. The tablets also described how Assurnasirpal II erected a monument in the city, which remains to be found. The archaeological site Matiate is located below the town and is assumed to have been in use for about 1,900 years and at its peak been inhabited by up to 70,000 people.

The leading Assyrian Syriac Orthodox family, the Safars, were highly placed in the Deksuri confederation, while other local Assyrians were aligned with the opposing, anti-government Heverkan confederation. In mid-1915, Assyrian Christians in Midyat considered resistance after hearing about massacres elsewhere, but the local Syriac Orthodox community initially refused to support this. Hanne Safar Pasha was persuaded to break with other Christian leaders who wanted to organize an uprising in Midyat. Shortly thereafter, Safar was killed after all male members of the pacifist Protestant Hermez family. In late June, kaymakam Nuri Bey disappeared, likely executed by Mehmed Reshid after refusing to massacre local Christian Assyrians. On 21 June, 100 Christian men (mostly Armenians and Assyrian Protestants) were arrested, tortured for confessions implicating others, and executed outside the city; this panicked the Assyrian population. Local people refused to hand over their arms, attacked government offices, and cut telegraph lines; local Arab and Kurdish tribes were recruited by the Ottoman government to attack the Christians. The town was pacified in early August after weeks of bloody urban warfare which killed hundreds of Christians (Assyrians and Armenians). Survivors fled east to the more-defensible Iwardo, which held out successfully with the food aid of local Yazidis.

== Demographics ==
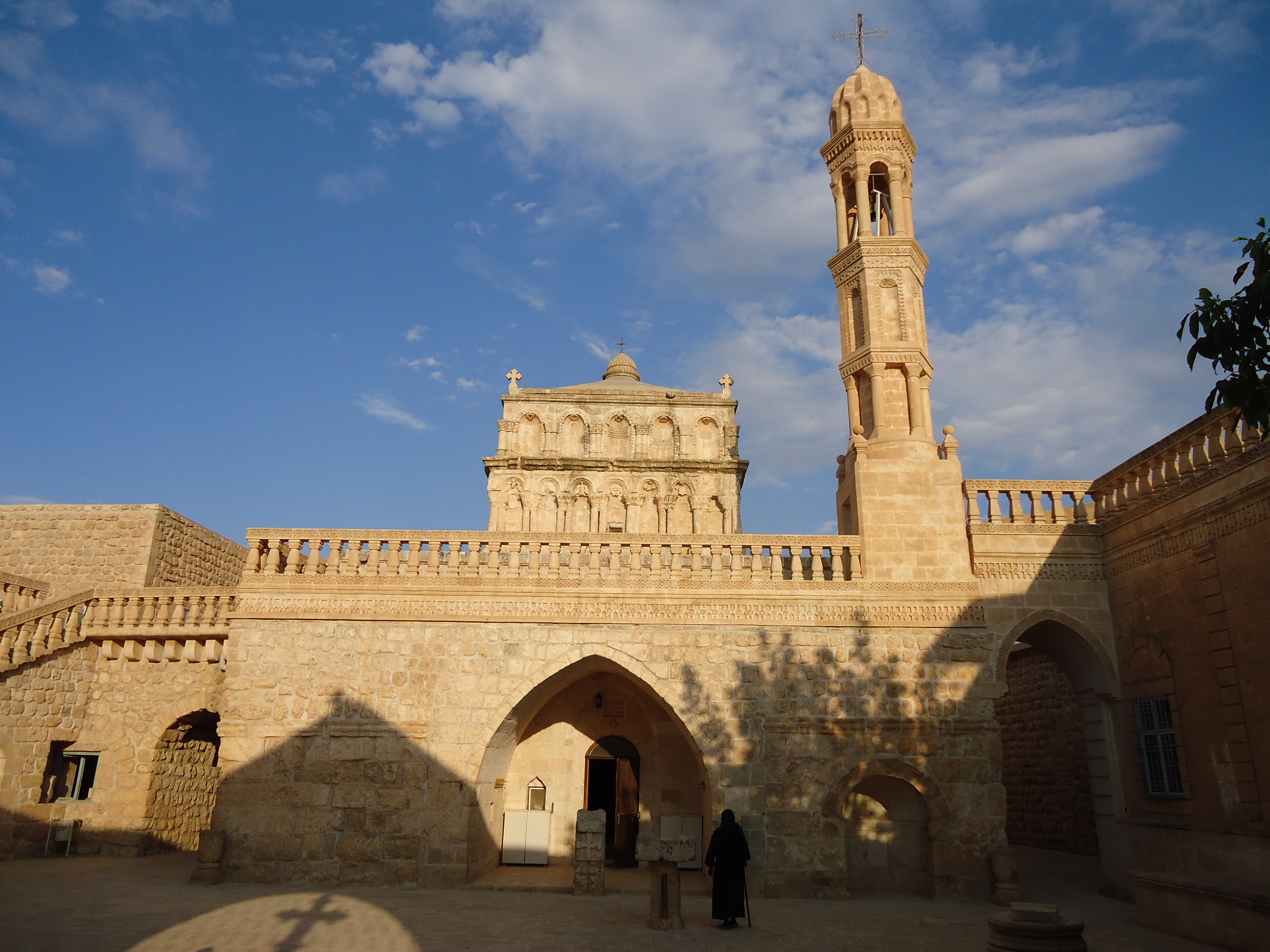
Syriac Orthodox Church in Midyat.

Midyat, in Diyarbekir vilayet, was the only town in the Ottoman Empire with an ethnic Assyrian majority, although denominationally divided among the Syriac Orthodox Church, Chaldean Catholic Church, and Assyrian Protestants.

On the eve of the First World War, various sources report a total population of about 8,000 people. Most of them being Syriac-Orthodox Christians, plus some Protestants, Syriac-Catholics, Chaldeans, Armenians, and Muslims (mostly Kurds). The Armenian Apostolic Patriarchate of Constantinople recorded 1,452 Armenians in the kaza of Midyat before the First World War.

Mother tongue, Midyat District, 1927 Turkish census
Turkish	Arabic	Kurdish	Circassian	Armenian	Syriac language
834	11,223	15,078	–	–	5,293

Religion, Midyat District, 1927 Turkish census
Muslim	Christian	Jewish	Unknown or other religion
25,358	2,667	8	4,195

Midyat is an historic centre of the Assyrians in Turkey, and as late as the Assyrian genocide in 1915 they constituted the majority of the city's population. During the early 20th century, the Assyrian population of the city started to gradually diminish due to emigration, but the community was still very large. The Assyrians of Tur Abdin were the only significant population of Christians outside of Istanbul, until 1979, when panic ensued over an act of war and an exodus of local Christians overtook the city as a result, because a mayor and major Assyrian figure in Turabdin of the city of Kerboran, now named Dargecit, was assassinated and replaced with a Kurdish representative against the peoples will. The Assyrians up until then had control over the local government, and could therefore unify to resist threats. Panic ensued as the local Muslim population made a symbolic declaration of war against the Assyrian people and soon after the takeover, local Mhallami and Kurdish inhabitants started immigrating into the traditionally Assyrian areas, causing a demographic shift which – along with the start of the Turkish-Kurdish conflict a few years later in 1984 – sounded a death toll to the community not only here, but in all of Tur Abdin. From a 1975 population of 50,000 comprising 10% of Mardin Province's demographic structure: barely 2,000 were left by the end of the conflict in 1999. Now only around 3–5,000 live in Tur Abdin, with the other 15–17,000 living in Istanbul and other still functioning Syriac Diocese like Adiyaman, Harput, and Diyarbakir.

The churches and houses belonging to the Christians have been preserved although many of them are empty, with their owners living away in Europe. At present 500 Assyrian Christians live in Midyat, and they have been joined by 100–300 Syriac refugees fleeing the Syrian Civil War who have settled in the city and region according to different estimates, and comprise less than 1% of the population of Midyat. There are five churches in the city, and all are Syriac.

== Composition ==
There are 72 neighbourhoods in Midyat District. Twelve of these (Akçakaya, Bağlar, Bahçelievler, Cumhuriyet, Gölcük, Işıklar, Ortaçarşı, Sanayi, Seyitler, Ulucamii, Yenimahalle and Yunus Emre) form the central town (merkez) of Midyat.

- Acırlı (Derizbîn)
- Adaklı (Kefsura Dermemikan)
- Akçakaya
- Altıntaş (Kfarze, Kevirzê)
- Anıtlı (Hah)
- Bağlar
- Bağlarbaşı (Arnas)
- Bahçelievler
- Bardakçı (Batê)
- Barıştepe (Selhê)
- Başyurt (Zaxuran)
- Bethkustan
- Budaklı (Karşaf)
- Çaldere (Heverîn)
- Çalpınar (Sîta)
- Çamyurt (Mesken)
- Çandarlı (Dawrîk)
- Çavuşlu (Şorizbah)
- Çayırlı (Kefnas)
- Cumhuriyet
- Danışman (Xerabê Reş)
- Doğançay (Mzizah, Mizîzex)
- Doğanyazı (Pîrkan)
- Dolunay (Kefzenk)
- Düzgeçit (Zernoka)
- Düzoba (Riş)
- Eğlence (Zinol)
- Elbeğendi (Kafro)
- Erişti (Tafo)
- Gelinkaya (Kafarhuvar)
- Gölcük
- Gülgoze (Iwardo)
- Gülveren (Behwar)
- Güngören (Keferb)
- Güven (Bacin)
- Hanlar (Xanika)
- Harmanlı (Beydarmemo)
- İkizdere (Duben)
- Işıklar
- Izbırak (Zaz)
- Kayabaşı (Şakolin)
- Kayalar (Kafarzota)
- Kayalıpınar (Mikrê)
- Kutlubey (Tinat)
- Mercimekli (Hapsenas)
- Narlı (Helax)
- Ortaca (Heşterek)
- Ortaçarşı
- Oyuklu (Taqa)
- Pelitli (Barbunus)
- Sanayi
- Sarıkaya (Haldeh)
- Sarıköy (Sed)
- Şenköy (Epşê)
- Seyitler
- Sivrice (Dalîn)
- Söğütlü (Kenderib)
- Taşlıburç (Kelehkê)
- Tepeli (Suwayê)
- Toptepe (Nibilê)
- Tulgalı (Xirbê Xelîd)
- Üçağıl (Kozê)
- Ulucamii
- Yayvantepe (Qertmîn)
- Yemişli (Anhel, Nehile)
- Yenice (Xerabya)
- Yenimahalle
- Yeşilöz (Kemmê)
- Yolbaşı (Kefferallab, Kefşerîn)
- Yunus Emre
- Yuvalı (Xerabê Hûriya)
- Ziyaret

In the 19th and early 20th centuries, Midyat was divided into 12 districts (The number 12 was possibly an influence from the 12 tribes of Israel). 11 of which were Syriac districts and one Muslim. These names still exist in the old population registration.

1. Griğovat Mahallesi ܫܰܘܬܐ ܕܒܝܬ ܓܪܝܓ݂ܘ
2. Kaşrovat Mahallesi ܫܰܘܬܐ ܕܒܝܬ ܩܰܫܪܘ
3. Çelme Mahallesi ܫܰܘܬܐ ܕܒܝܬ ܬܫܰܠܡܰܐ
4. Bahdovat Mahallesi ܫܰܘܬܐ ܕܒܝܬ ܒܰܚܕܝ
5. Saidovat Mahallesi ܫܰܘܬܐ ܕܒܝܬ ܣܰܥܝܕܘ
6. Melke Mire Mahallesi ܫܰܘܬܐ ܕܒܝܬ ܡܰܠܟܶܐ ܡܝܪܶܗ
7. Ğannovat Mahallesi ܫܰܘܬܐ ܕܒܝܬ ܓ݂ܰܢܢܘ
8. Barlat Mahallesi ܒܰܪܠܰܐܛ
9. Zabok Mahallesi ܙܰܒܘܩ
10. Çıfçaka Mahallesi ܬܫܷܦܬܫܰܩܰܐ
11. Protestan Mahallesi ܦ݁ܪܘܛ (Hırmız)
12. İslam Mahallesi ܛܰܝ̈ܶܐ (Nehroz, Mehmedo)

Notable Syriac leaders in Midyat were: Galle Hermez (Hırmız) (1859–1915) Hanne Safar (Sefer) (+1915) Isa Zatte Chalma (1875–1917) Ibrahim Shabo (Şahho) (1904–1956)

== Economy ==
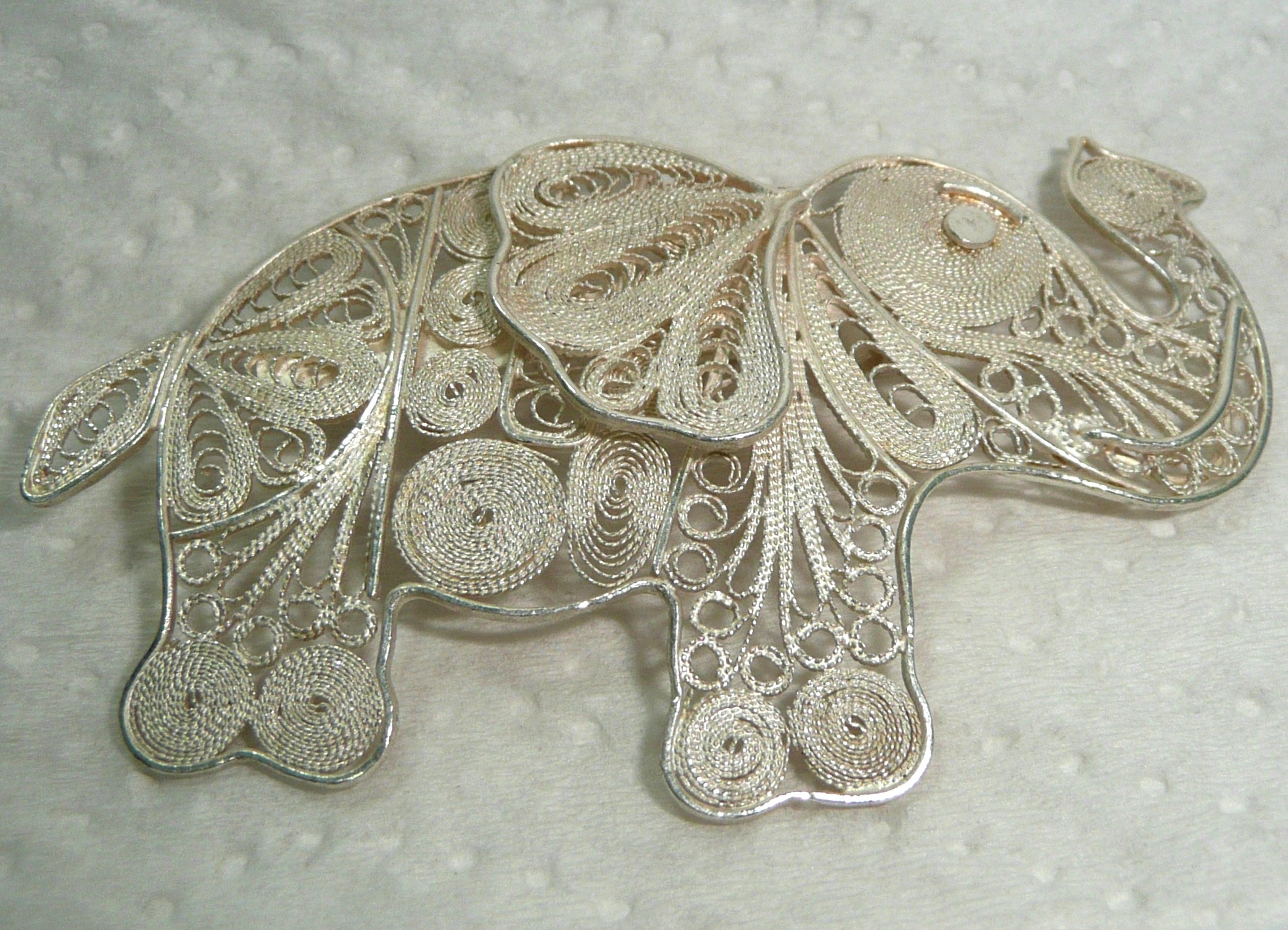
Telkari silver jewelry from Midyat, a popular export and handicraft

Midyat is the regional center of commerce for the district, and is one of the largest cities in Mardin Province. Similarly with Mardin, the city is known for its Syriac handicrafts such as carpets, towels and other cloth goods. More specific to the city is its Syriac silver crafts called telkari, which are handcrafted filigreed ornaments. To the east of the city there is a winery that makes traditional Syriac wine: a wine native to the region. Another staple in the Midyat market is its bulgur, which is a cereal food derived from wheat.

In 1850, the Midyat Guest House was built at the highest point of the city, commissioned by the prominent Assyrian/Syriac Shabo family. The Guest House consists of three stories, and the roof is also accessible to which a view of the city of Midyat can be seen. The Guest House has since become a symbol of the city attracting domestic and foreign tourists. The Guest House has been used as a filming location for a number of TV series, films, and television programs, such as Sıla and Hercai. The building was eventually restored by the Municipality of Midyat to its original form.

In December 2023, the Midyat Telkâri Museum was opened, exhibiting a wide variety of works from the Roman Empire, Byzantine Empire, Ottoman Empire and the Republican periods. The museum was established by the local municipality and is situated on top of a house built in 1850 by the Assyrian Gelle Hirmız family.

== Climate ==
Midyat, part of the province of Mardin, has a semi-arid climate with very hot and dry summers and cold, wet, and occasionally snowy winters. Temperatures in summer usually increase to 40–50 °C (104–122 °F) due to Mardin being situated right next to the border with Syria. Snowfall is quite common between the months of December and March, snowing for a week or two. Mardin has over 3,000 hours of sun per year. The highest recorded temperature is 48.8 °C.

Climate data for Mardin, Midyat
Month	Jan	Feb	Mar	Apr	May	Jun	Jul	Aug	Sep	Oct	Nov	Dec	Year
Mean daily maximum °C (°F)	6.1 (43.0)	7.5 (45.5)	12.0 (53.6)	17.7 (63.9)	24.2 (75.6)	30.9 (87.6)	35.3 (95.5)	34.9 (94.8)	30.4 (86.7)	23.1 (73.6)	14.4 (57.9)	8.2 (46.8)	20.4 (68.7)
Daily mean °C (°F)	3.1 (37.6)	4.1 (39.4)	8.2 (46.8)	13.7 (56.7)	19.7 (67.5)	25.8 (78.4)	30.0 (86.0)	29.6 (85.3)	25.2 (77.4)	18.5 (65.3)	10.7 (51.3)	5.2 (41.4)	16.1 (61.1)
Mean daily minimum °C (°F)	0.6 (33.1)	1.3 (34.3)	4.7 (40.5)	9.9 (49.8)	15.1 (59.2)	20.2 (68.4)	24.6 (76.3)	24.6 (76.3)	20.6 (69.1)	14.6 (58.3)	7.7 (45.9)	2.7 (36.9)	12.2 (54.0)
Average precipitation mm (inches)	99.8 (3.93)	110.7 (4.36)	94.6 (3.72)	75.5 (2.97)	37.7 (1.48)	8.3 (0.33)	3.3 (0.13)	1.2 (0.05)	4.1 (0.16)	33.3 (1.31)	68.7 (2.70)	104.2 (4.10)	641.4 (25.24)
Average rainy days	10.6	10.6	10.7	9.9	6.6	1.7	0.5	0.2	0.7	5.3	7.4	10.2	74.4
Mean monthly sunshine hours	139.5	142.8	189.1	222	310	375	396.8	368.9	315	238.7	174	136.4	3,008.2
Source: Devlet Meteoroloji İşleri Genel Müdürlüğü

== Gallery ==
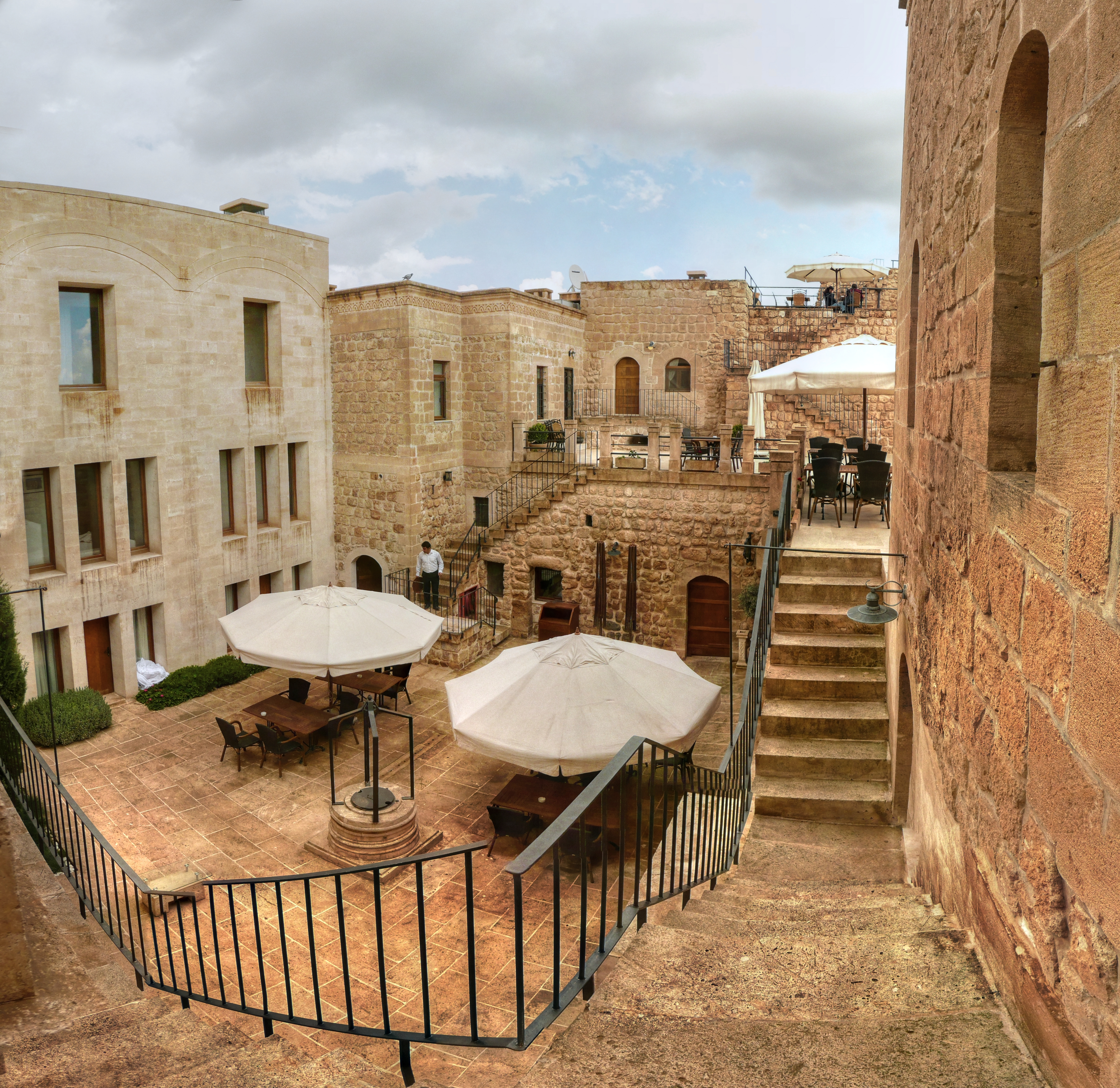
Courtyard of the Kasr-i Nehroz hotel

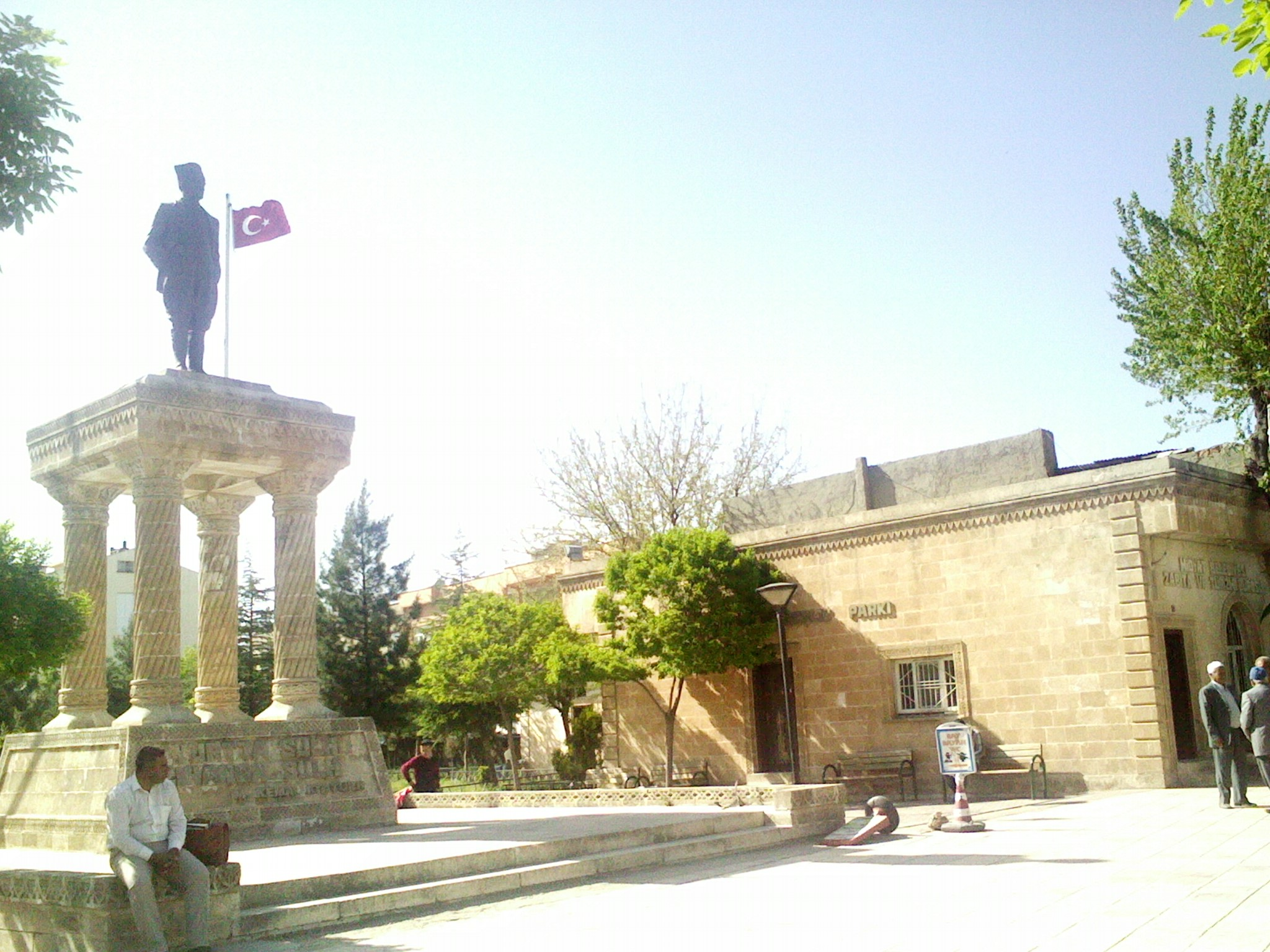
A statue of Mustafa Kemal Atatürk in Kardeşlik Park

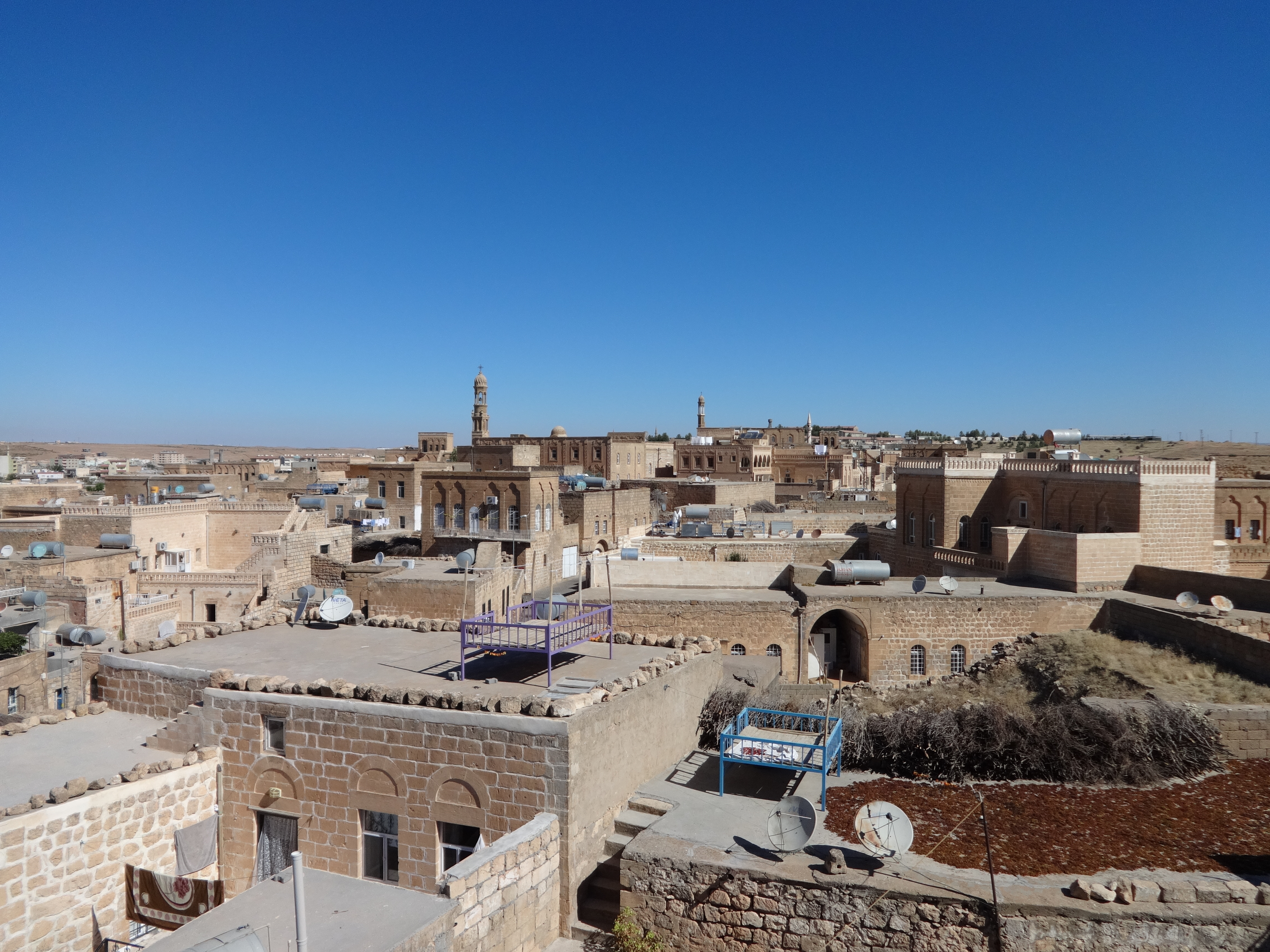
Midyat (2013): A picture of the Assyrian old town, taken from a rooftop in the southeastern part of the old town facing north.

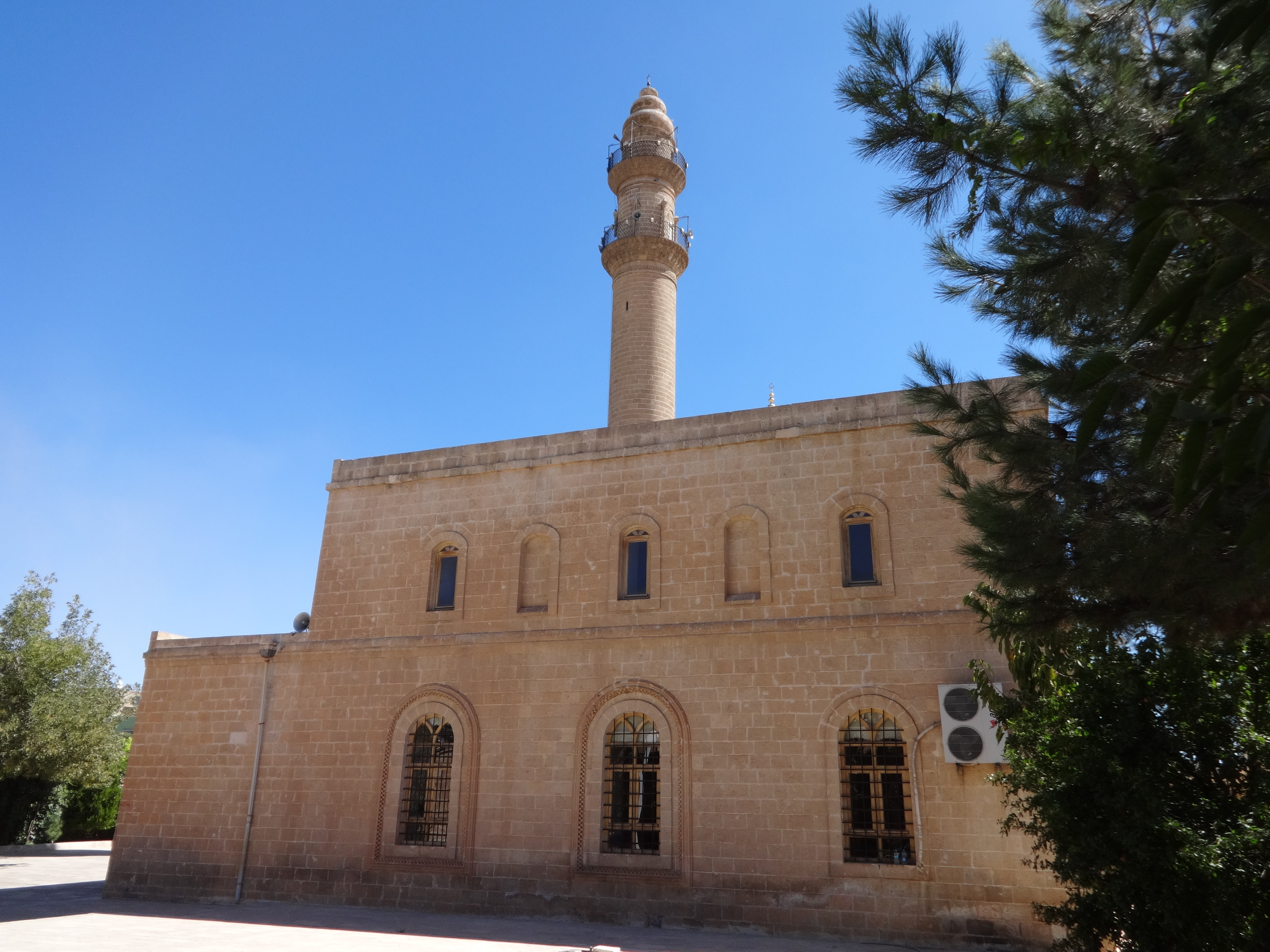
A mosque in Midyat

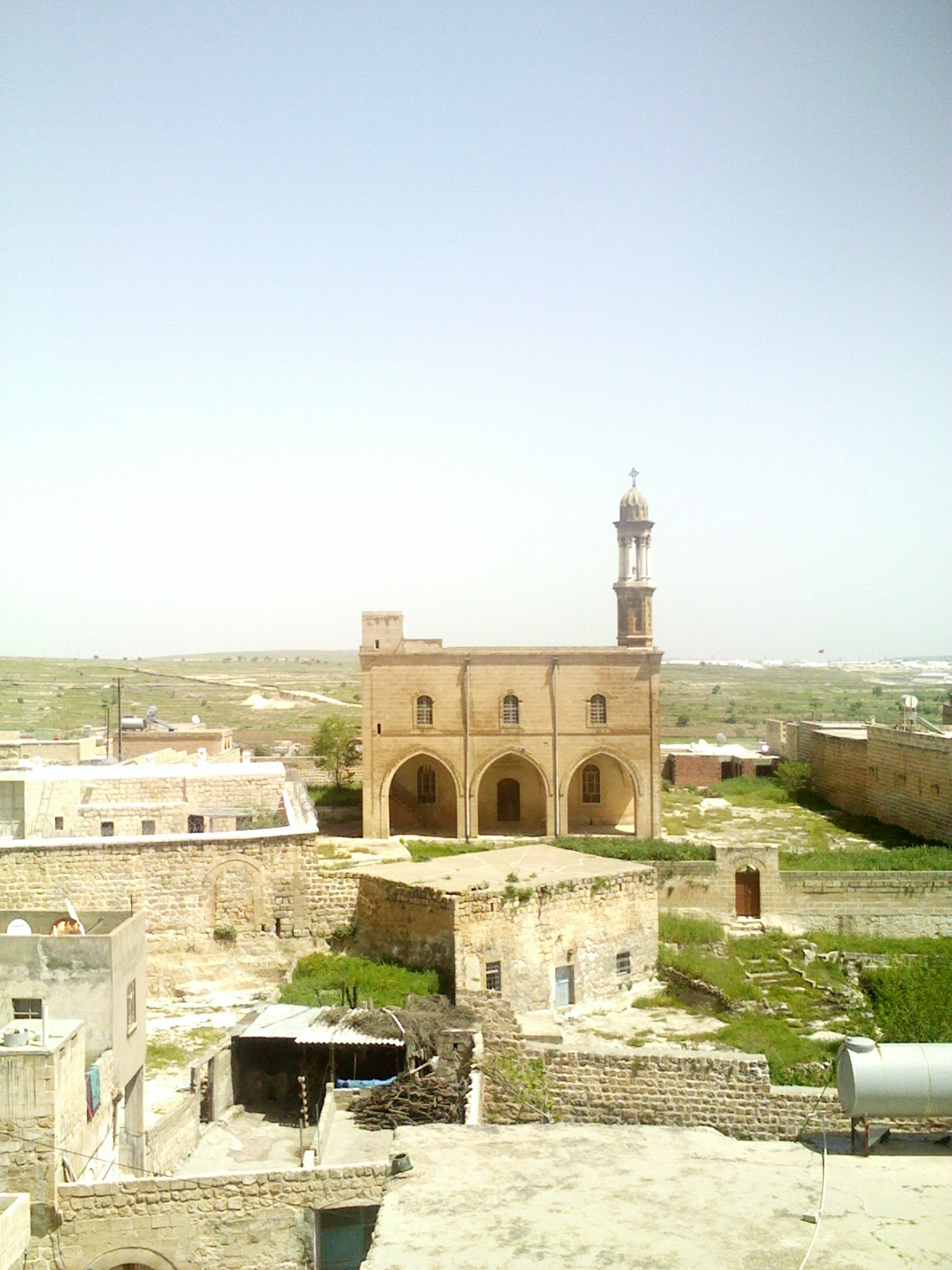
The Protestant Church of Midyat, located in old Midyat- pictured prior to its renovation in 2014/2015.

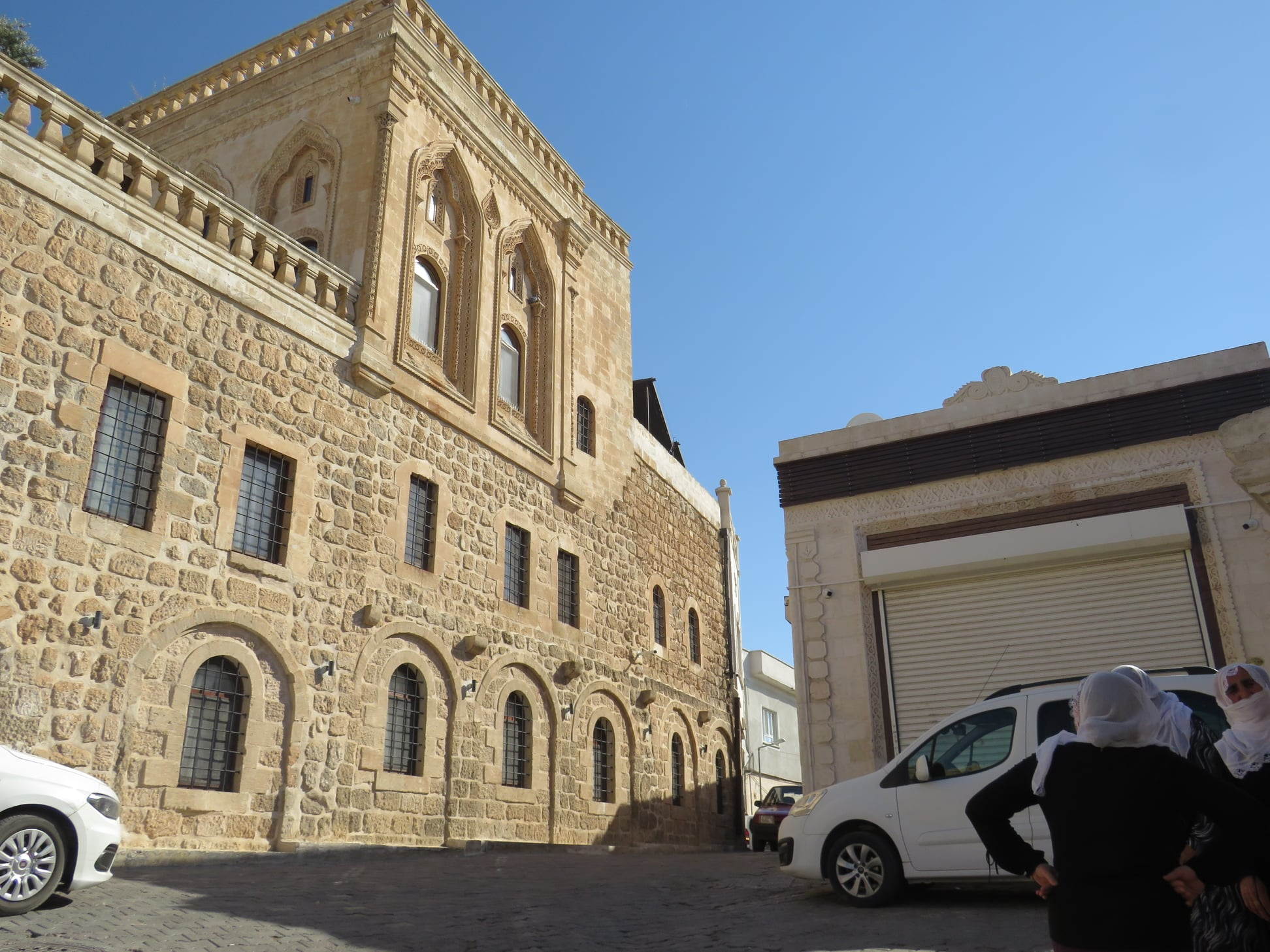
Syriac Christian quarter in Midyat

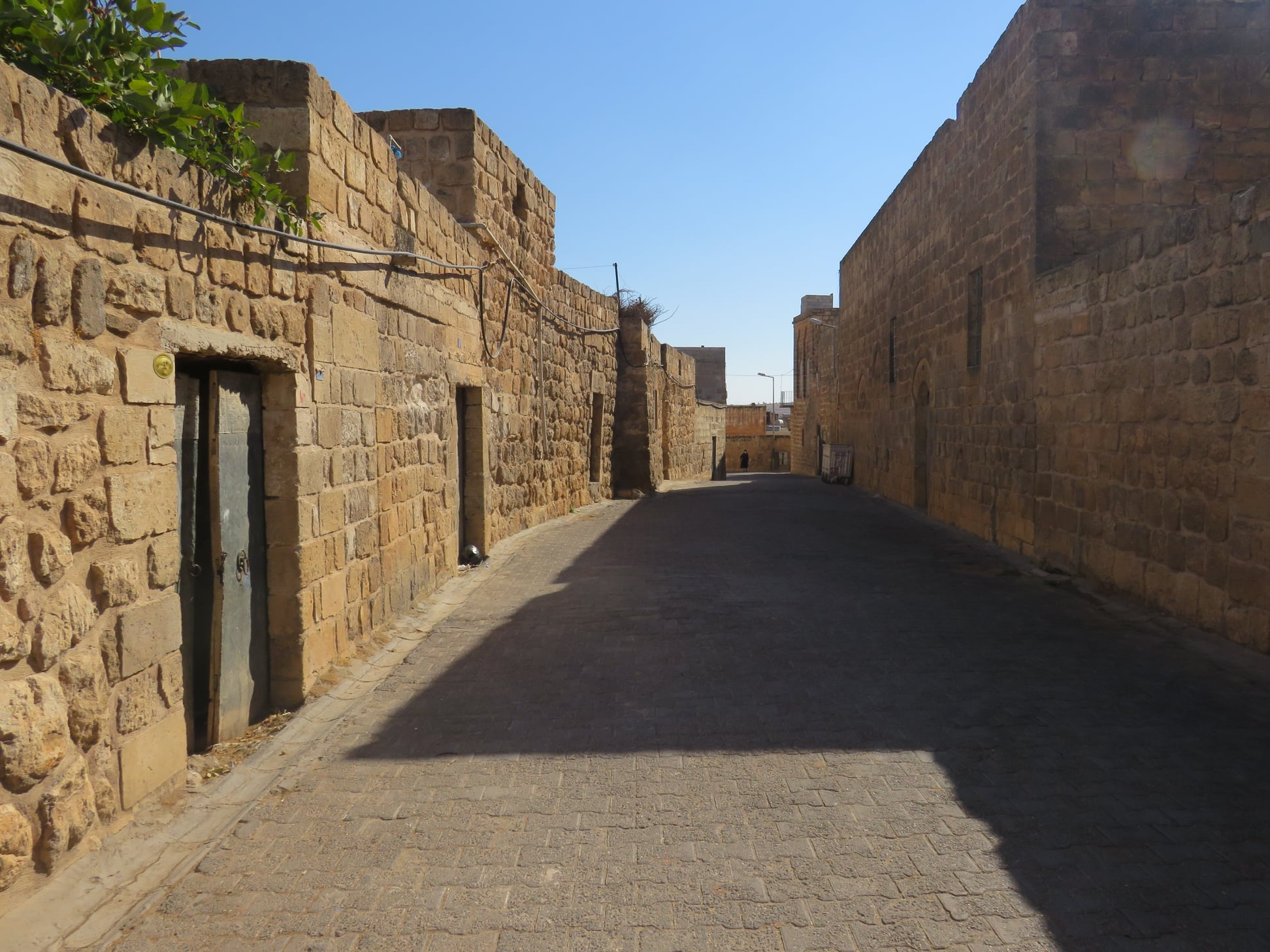
Syriac Christian quarter in Midyat

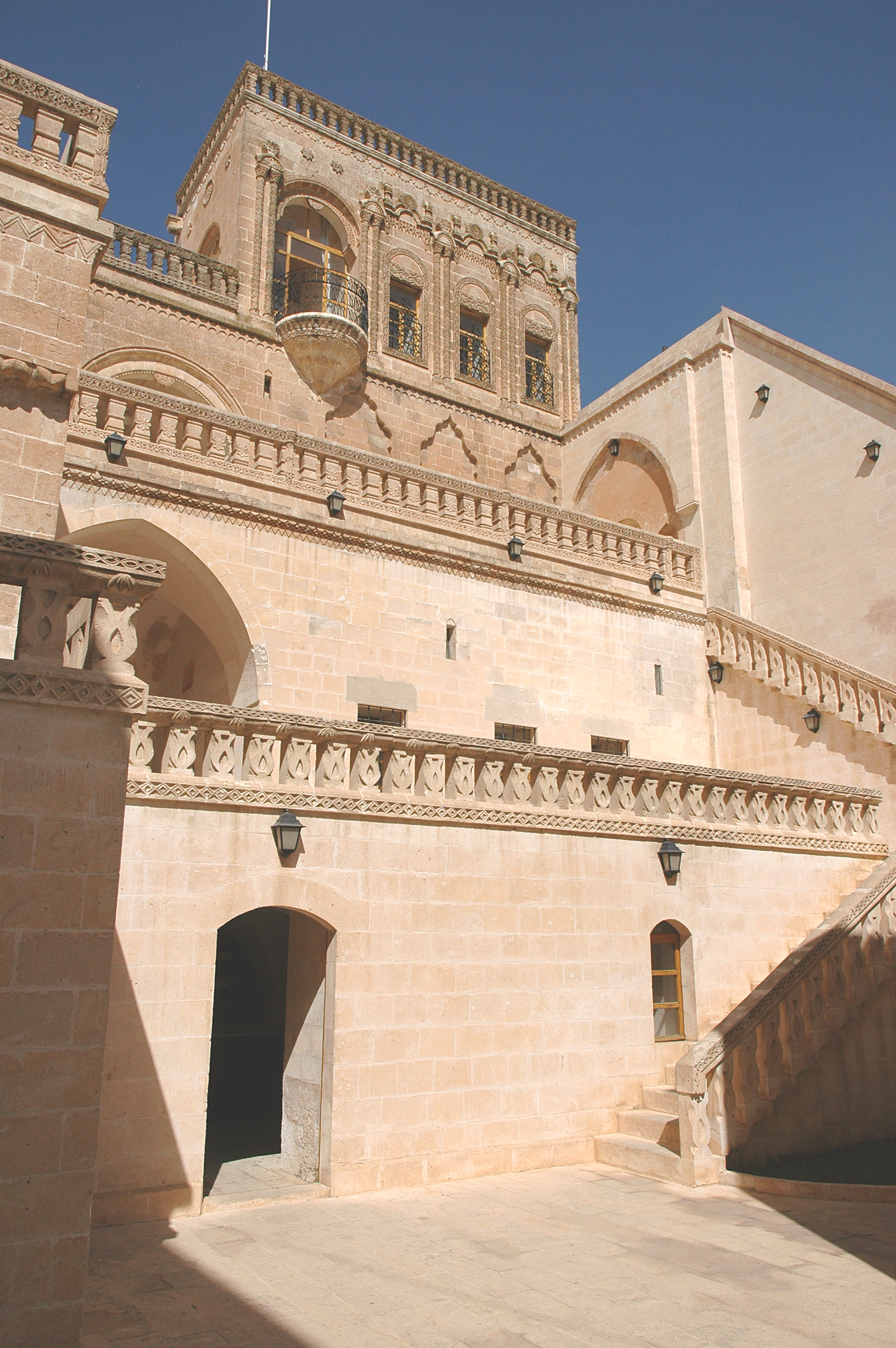
The Midyat Guest House as pictured in 2005

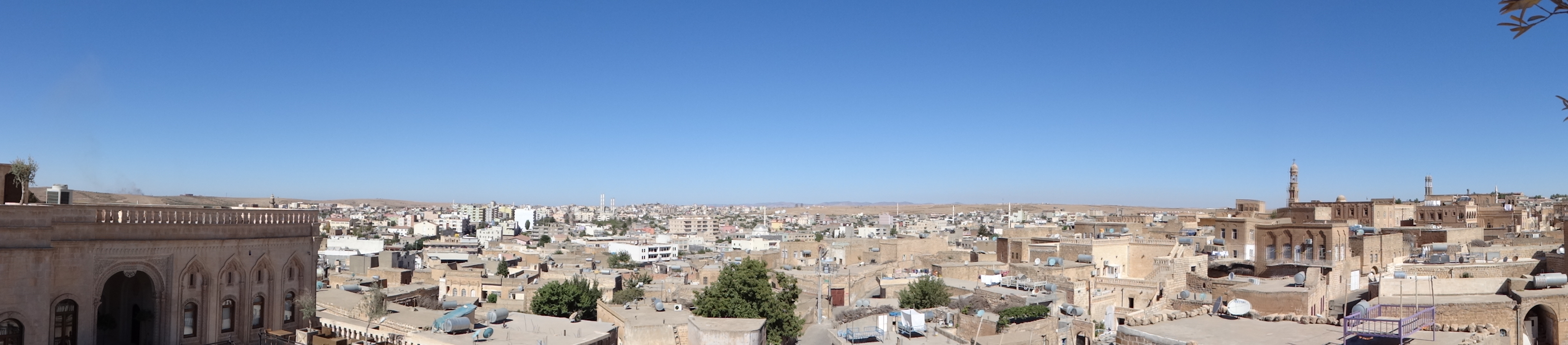
Panorama of the city of Midyat

== Sources ==
- Gaunt, David (2006). Massacres, Resistance, Protectors: Muslim-Christian Relations in Eastern Anatolia During World War I. Gorgias Press. ISBN 978-1-59333-301-0.
- Gaunt, David (2015). "The Complexity of the Assyrian Genocide". Genocide Studies International. 9 (1): 83–103. doi:10.3138/gsi.9.1.05. ISSN 2291-1847.
- Gaunt, David (2020). "The Long Assyrian Genocide". Collective and State Violence in Turkey: The Construction of a National Identity from Empire to Nation-State. Berghahn Books. pp. 56–96. ISBN 978-1-78920-451-3.
- Kaiser, Hilmar (2014). The Extermination of Armenians in the Diarbekir Region. İstanbul Bilgi University Press. ISBN 978-605-399-333-9.
- Kévorkian, Raymond (2011). The Armenian Genocide: A Complete History. Bloomsbury Publishing. ISBN 978-0-85771-930-0.
- Radner, Karen (2006). "How to reach the Upper Tigris: The route through the Tur Abdin". State Archives of Assyria Bulletin. 15: 273–305.
