= El Presidente =

El Presidente is Spanish for "The President".

== Entertainment ==
- El Presidente (band), a Scottish glam rock band
  - El Presidente (album), a 2005 album by the band
- El Presidente: General Emilio Aguinaldo Story and the First Philippine Republic, a 2012 Filipino film
- El Presidente (TV series), a 2020 Chilean TV series
- "El Presidente", a 2004 song by the Modena City Ramblers
- "El Presidente", a song by Herb Alpert's Tijuana Brass from the 1964 album South of the Border
- "El Presidente", the protagonist in the Tropico video game series

== People ==
- Ramon Fernandez (born 1953), a four-time MVP of the Philippine Basketball Association who was nicknamed El Presidente
- Dennis Martínez (born 1955), a Major League Baseball player who was nicknamed El Presidente
- Mahmoud Al-Zein (born 1966), Lebanese crime lord and current head of the Al-Zein Clan; he is nicknamed El Presidente
- El Presidente (musician) (born 1973), Italian rapper
- Dave Portnoy (born 1977), founder and editor of the blog Barstool Sports

== Other ==
- El Presidente (cocktail), a type of drink made with vermouth
- El Presidente, a combat pistol shooting drill
- El Presidente, common name for a Presidente cigar

== See also ==
- El Presidente of Mandaue, the mayor of Mandaue, Philippines, during the American commonwealth era (1899–1943)
- El Señor Presidente, a 1946 Spanish novel by Miguel Ángel Asturias
- "El President", a song by the band Drugstore
- "Meet El Presidente", a song from the 1987 Duran Duran album Notorious
