= Lebanese people in Germany =

Ethnic group in Germany

- Distribution of Lebanese citizens in Germany (2021)

Total population
- 171,000 (2025, people with Lebanese immigration history); 47,680 (2025, Lebanese citizens without German citizenship)

Regions with significant populations
- Berlin, Essen, Bremen, Hamburg, Dortmund, Cologne, Düsseldorf, Hannover, Stuttgart, Münster, Gelsenkirchen, Bochum, Aachen, Bielefeld, Herne

Languages
- German, Lebanese Arabic

Religion
- Islam, Christianity, Druze

Related ethnic groups
- Lebanese diaspora

In the narrow sense, Lebanese people in Germany (Arabic: اللبنانيون في ألمانيا, romanized: al-Lubnānīyūn fī Almāniyā) refers to migrants from Lebanon living in Germany and their descendants, excluding Palestinians.

In the broader sense, the term also includes Palestinians who emigrated from Lebanon to Germany and their descendants. Under this definition, there are three major groups: ethnic Lebanese, Mhallami Kurds, and Libo-Palestinians.

No concrete data exists on their religious affiliations.

== Ethnic Lebanese ==
People with ethnic Lebanese roots represent the largest group of Lebanese in Germany.

=== History ===
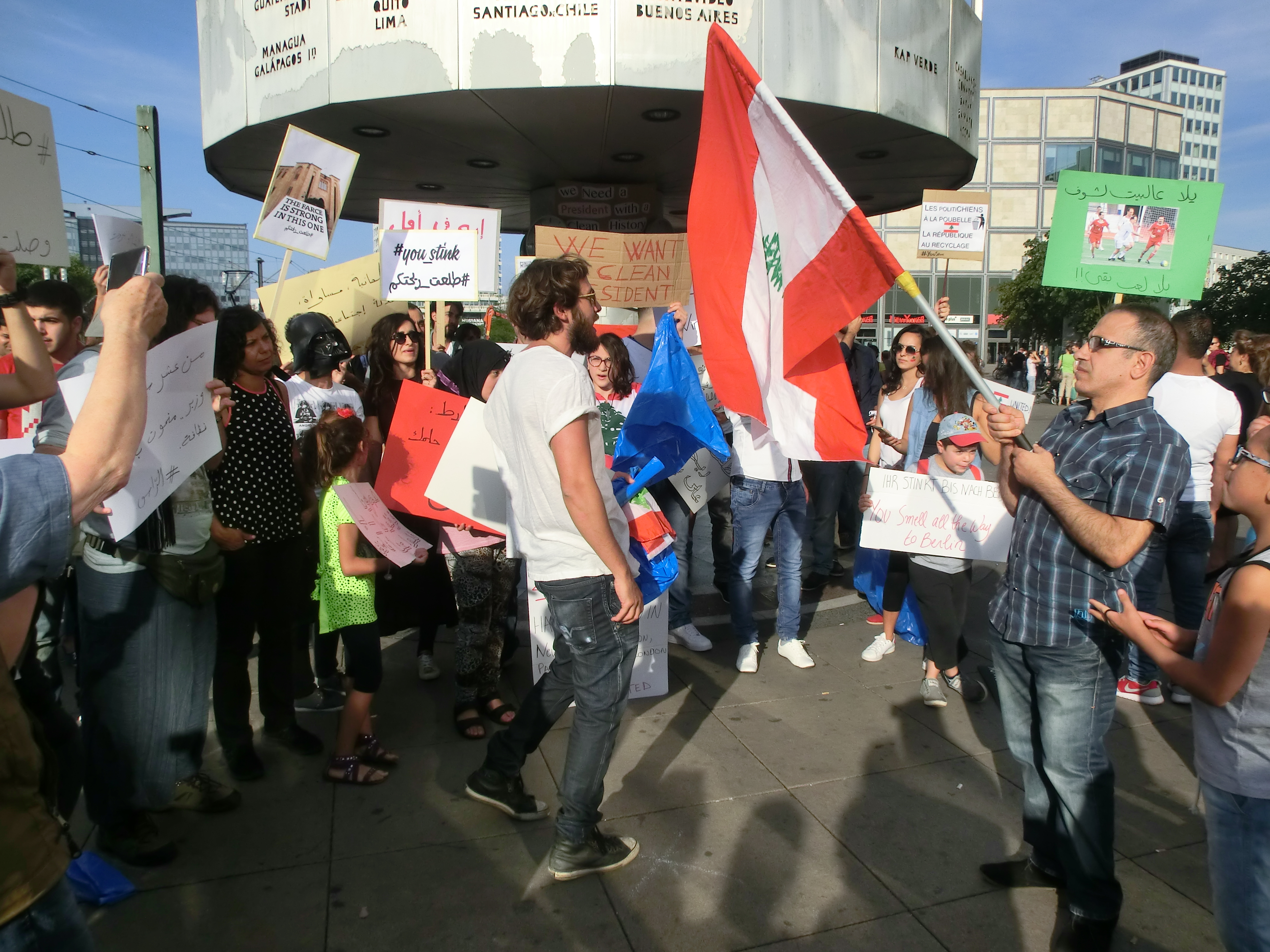
Lebanese people in Germany express their support of the 2015 Lebanese protests in Berlin at Alexanderplatz, August 29, 2015

Although there has been sporadic migration from the Middle East to Germany since the 20th century, the real growth of the German Lebanese population began in 1975, with the start of the civil war in Lebanon which drove thousands of people away. Nevertheless, most people immigrated in the 1980s and in the beginning of the 1990s (the year after the war) to Germany as refugees. Especially in the late 1980s a large number fled to Germany. Notably in the second half of the 1990s and in the beginning of the 2000s, many Lebanese were naturalized.

=== Presence ===
Nowadays, people of Lebanese descent form one of the largest minorities in Germany. Most of them hold German and Lebanese citizenship (dual citizenship).

Berlin has the largest community of Lebanese and their descendants. Other big cities with a high percentage are Essen, Ruhr area Bremen and Hannover Region.

In 2024, Federal Statistical Office of Germany (Destatis) estimates that 183,000 people of Lebanese background live in Germany.

== Mhallami Kurds ==
=== History ===
Mhallami are also called Mardalli, because their ancestors are originally from Mardin (a predominantly Kurdish region located in Turkey near Syrian border) or other regions in Turkey as an Arab minority. Although with the authorities they were forced to have Turkish surnames, they kept their Arab surnames in everyday life and speak Arabic. Since the 1920s, many Mhallami immigrated from Turkey to Lebanon and lived there where they bore Arab surnames. Since Lebanon Civil War, especially in the 1980s, a large number of Mhallami from Lebanon immigrated to Europe. Most of them came to Germany without any citizenship. Nevertheless, they were listed under "Person with unknown origin" and not "stateless persons".

=== Presence ===
Nowadays, the majority of Mhallamis have German citizenship in Lebanon, most Mhallami were stateless. The largest community is in Berlin. Other cities with many Mhallami are Essen and Bremen. In recent years they have become a frequent topic in German media because almost all Arab clans in Germany that are known to the police to be involved in organized crime are Arab families. Many clans have thousands of members. Nevertheless, the majority of them are not involved in crime or similar things, only some parts of the family. Examples of large Mhallami clans are Al-/El-Zein, Omeirat, Miri, Remmo/Rammo, Saado, Semmo, Fakhro and Ali-Khan.

=== Mhallami clan crimes ===
Since the 1980s after the Lebanese Civil War, many Mhallamiye and Palestinians came to then West Germany, many of them came to West Berlin. Due to less help and work opportunities for Mhallami and Palestinians residents and many of them were left in the lurch, many Mhallamis and Palestinians started to found their own clans. Many clans were found in West Berlin in 1980s and later in Bremen and Ruhr area in cities like Essen and Duisburg. Since then many crimes were committed by clans including mayhem, robbery and political intimidations. In 2023 there were a brawl between Mhallamis and Syrians in Essen after the Syrian clans attacked Mhallami clans in Castrop-Rauxel. There were many injuries and the danger in public safety for normal civilians to get involved in brawl were higher.

== Palestinians ==
=== History ===
In the beginning of the 1970s and 1990s and especially during the Lebanon war (1975-1990) many Palestinians fled to Germany as refugees from Lebanon. While most Lebanese immigrated during the last years of the war, the biggest immigration wave of Palestinians was earlier. A lot of them had lived in refugees camps in Lebanon for some years or longer before they moved on to Germany. Palestinian immigrants usually came to Germany as stateless persons without citizenship.

=== Presence ===
Libo-Palestinians mostly see themselves as Palestinians or of Palestinian descent/heritage and not as Lebanese or of Lebanese descent. Most German Palestinians live in Berlin by far where they form the largest community of Arabs besides Lebanese. Nevetherless there are also other cities with a high percentage like Bonn and Frankfurt.

=== Estimates ===
There is no official data how many Libo-Palestinians and also Palestinians in general live in Germany. In 2017, c. 25,000 people were stateless in Germany and most of them were Palestinians. Nevertheless, today, the majority is not stateless any more and have German citizenship. In 2010, the number of all Palestinians living in Germany is estimated at c. 200,000 people.

== Turks ==
Due to the numerous wars in Lebanon since the 1970s onwards, many Turks of Lebanon have sought refuge in Turkey and Europe, particularly in Germany. Indeed, many Lebanese Turks were aware of the large Turkish-German population and saw this as an opportunity to find work once settling in Europe. In particular, the largest wave of Lebanese-Turkish migration occurred once the Israel-Lebanon war of 2006 began. During this period more than 20,000 Turks fled Lebanon, particularly from Beirut, and settled in Germany.

== See also ==
- Arabs in Germany
- Arabs in Berlin
- Arabs in Europe
- Arab diaspora
- Lebanese diaspora
- Immigration to Germany
- Germany–Lebanon relations
- Iranians in Germany
- Syrians in Germany
- Iraqis in Germany
- Kurds in Germany
- Turks in Germany
