= Crime in Germany =

- Homicide: 0.9 (2024)
- Assault: 182.8 (2023)
- Burglary: 352.4 (2024)
- Theft: 1358.8 (2024)
- Fraud: 882.8 (2024)
- Corruption: 8.7 (2024)
- Bribery: 1.4 (2024)
- Money laundering: 44.5 (2024)
- Rape: 15.5 (2023)
- Sexual violence: 62.3 (2023)
- reported per 100,000 inhabitants

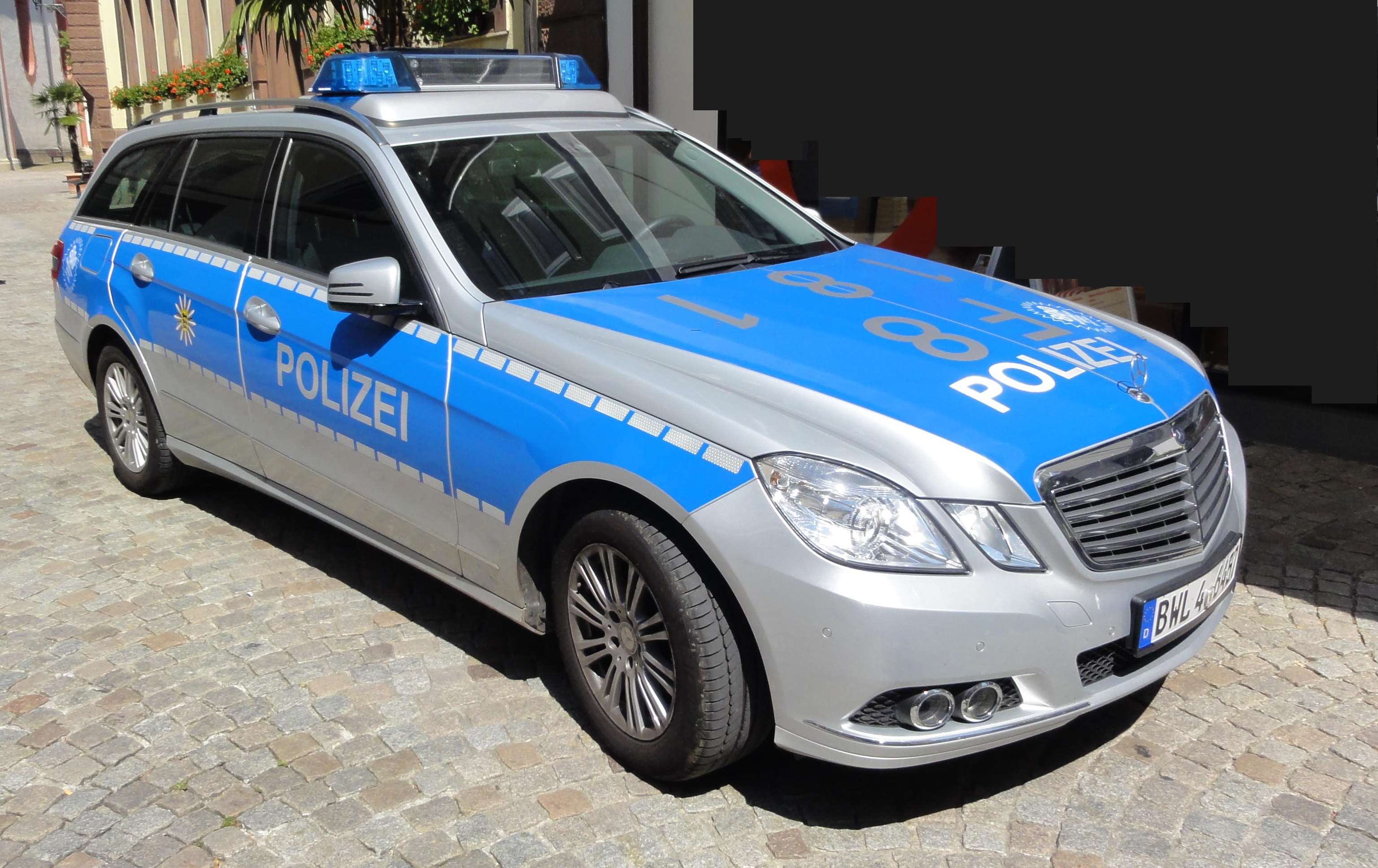
Mercedes-Benz Police patrol vehicle of the State Police of Baden-Württemberg (2012)

Crime in Germany is handled by the German police forces and other agencies.

== Recent trends ==
=== Statistics ===
The official statistics PKS 2018 of 2018 by the Bundeskriminalamt for the year 2017 shows an increase of 39.9% for resistance and attacks against state authority, 13.6% in the spreading of pornographic material, 8.3% in crimes against the German drug law, 6.1% for narcotic-related crimes generally and 5.5% in violations of the German arms law. On the other hand, there was a decrease of 18.2% in sexual assault, rape, sexual harassment including cases with lethal consequences, 16.3% in burglaries, 9.3% in violations of the immigration laws, 7.6% in fraud, 7.5% in theft and 6% in street crime.

=== European Union Statistics on Income and Living Conditions (EU-SILC) ===
In the EU-SILC survey, respondents were questioned about whether they experienced problems with violence, crime, or vandalism in the area where they live. Between 2010 and 2017, the EU crime average dropped by 3%. All countries in the EU except Germany, Sweden, and Lithuania showed a falling trend of criminal incidents.

== By type ==
According to Germany's 2010 crime statistics, 5.93 million criminal acts were committed, which was 2% lower than in 2009. According to the Interior Ministry, this was the first time the figure had fallen below six million offenses since 1991 (the year after reunification), and is the lowest crime level since records began. The rate of crimes solved in 2010 was 56%, a record high from 2009's 55.6%.

In 2010, internet-related crime climbed 8.1%, with around 224,000 reported cases. The number of house burglaries in 2010 also increased by 6.6%.

=== Domestic violence ===
According to 2015 statistics, there were 127,000 victims of domestic violence. (German: Häusliche Gewalt) 82% of the victims were female. This represented an increase of 5.5% over 2012 statistics. The most commonly reported crime was bodily harm, defined as a slap or a strike of sufficient force to warrant prosecution. Other common crimes were threats (14.4%), grievous bodily harm (German: schwere Körperverletzung), and injury with a deadly outcome (German: Verletzung mit Todesfolge) at 12%. A fourth of the suspects were reported to be intoxicated from the consumption of alcohol.

Ex-partner victims were mostly targeted by stalking.

=== Murder ===
The homicide rate in Germany is similarly low to the EU and other developed countries. Homicides increased rapidly in the early 1990s, increasing from 931 in 1990 to 2,032 - 2.5 per 100,000 in 1995 and gradually decreasing in the next 15 years before stabilizing at lower rates from around 2010 (0.98 per 100,000 or 783) to the present with 782 in 2020 at a rate of 0.93 per 100,000.

=== Hate crime ===
The German Criminal Code does not have hate crime legislation, instead, it criminalizes hate speech under a number of different laws, including Volksverhetzung. In the German legal framework motivation is not taken into account while identifying the element of the offence. However, within the sentencing procedure the judge can define certain principles for determining punishment. In section 46 of the German Criminal Code it is stated that "the motives and aims of the perpetrator; the state of mind reflected in the act and the willfulness involved in its commission" can be taken into consideration when determining the punishment; under this statute, hate and bias have been taken into consideration in sentencing in past cases.

Hate crimes are not specifically tracked by German police, but have been studied separately: a recently published EU "Report on Racism" finds that racially motivated attacks are frequent in Germany, identifying 18,142 incidences for 2006, of which 17,597 were motivated by right-wing ideologies, both about a 14% year-by-year increase. Relative to the size of the population, this represents an eightfold higher rate of hate crimes than reported in the US during the same period. Awareness of hate crimes in Germany remains low.

== Organized crime ==
View chart definition.
Number of suspects in organized crime in Germany

In the 1990s, the power balance changed in the red light districts of Germany when Russian, Yugoslav, and Albanian organizations started to operate. In parts of Germany, police asked themselves whether they had suppressed German gangs too much as the gangs that took over were more brutal foreign gangs.

In 2017, statistics suggested that German citizens constitute the largest group of suspects in organized crime trials. From 2016 to 2017, the proportion of non-German citizen organized crime suspects increased from 67.5% to 70.7%. 14.9% of the German citizens involved held different citizenship at birth.

=== Italian organized crime ===
The 'Ndrangheta, Camorra, and Mafia all operate in Germany. The 'Ndrangheta has the most robust presence. There are an estimated 1,200 members of the Calabrian 'Ndrangheta active in Germany, mostly in the cocaine trade. Apart from the 'Ndrangheta, the Neapolitan Camorra has also infiltrated the construction industry in Germany. Five Sicilian Mafia groups are active in the country, but seem to have lost power. Italian crime groups can mostly be found in the Ruhr district and in the west of Germany.

In December 2018, German police conducted an operation against the 'Ndrangheta in Germany and arrested 90 suspects for suspected drug dealing and money laundering. Forty-seven suspects were prosecuted.

=== Outlaw motorcycle gangs ===
OMCGs such as Hells Angels, Bandidos, Gremium and more recently, Satudarah, Rock Machine and Night Wolves, are active throughout Germany. While not all members of motorcycle clubs are criminals, many are reputed to be involved in the red-light districts and the bouncer scene, who control a large portion of the drug trade within bars and clubs.

=== Balkan crime gangs ===
People from the Balkans have strong connections to their home country where they can go underground when they want to evade police. Mafia gangs from Kosovo, Croatia, and Albania have close-knit structures similar to those of the Arab clans. Gangs from Croatia and Bosnia & Herzegovina have a strong tendency to use violence and according to police, are not discouraged by ordinary police as they have fought in the Yugoslav Wars. A number of these gangsters are ex-special forces who served under warlords during the wars in Croatia, Bosnia and Kosovo. Gangs from the Balkans are active in illegal gambling, protection rackets, narcotics trade and human trafficking. The Yugoslav wars also mean these gangs have access to firearms, where 700 thousand weapons were stolen in Albania alone.

==== Serbian mafia ====
The Zemun clan is active in Germany and mainly involved in drug trafficking and prostitution. Members are largely ethnic Serbs, some of them former soldiers, but Montenegrins and Bosniaks from the Serbian region are part of the ex-Yugoslavian gangs as well.

=== Russian mafia ===
Russian-speaking crime groups, in particular, the Tambov gang are active in cities such as Düsseldorf. Money laundering, prostitution and extortion seem to be their activities of choice. Aside from the Russian groups, Georgian, Armenian and Chechen crime groups are active in Germany as well. Very often these gangs and the Russian groups are named together in one breath even when they have little to do with each other.

Another major form of Russian-speaking organized crime in Germany consists of so-called criminal Aussiedler families. Aussiedlers are ethnic Germans (also called Volga Germans, Russia Germans) that were born in the former Soviet Union. While a lot of Aussiedlers adapted well and quickly mastered the German language, a lot of families held onto the traditional lifestyle they lived in Russia and surrounding states. This led to the formation of individual as well as clan-based groups of Aussiedlers involved in organized criminal activities such as drug trafficking, extortion, prostitution, as well as extreme violence. Due to a large number of Aussiedlers they are seen as the major form of Russian organized crime in Germany.

=== Middle Eastern crime clans ===
Middle Eastern crime clans have become a major player in the underworld of Germany since the mass emigration of large Middle Eastern families, also called Großfamilie. Especially in cities such as Berlin, Hamburg, and Bremen Middle Eastern clans are highly active in heroin trafficking as well as being involved in the bouncer-scene. Middle Eastern crime families mostly have origins in Turkey more precisely in Mardin (mainly in Hamburg).

Middle Eastern crime clans come from different backgrounds, but the most numerous of them are the Mhallami clans such as the Al-Zein Clan and the Miri clan amongst others.

==== Turkish mafia ====
External videos
- Almanya'daki Türk çetesi 36 Boys (Turkish Gangs in Germany) Al-Jazeera

Turkish crime groups which consist of mafia clans from Turkey are active throughout Germany in extortion, weapon trafficking and drug trafficking. Often the gangs can be linked to political groups from their home country, such as the Grey Wolves for right-wing Turks and Dev Sol for left-wing Turks.

In 2014, the annual report on organized crime presented in Berlin by Federal Minister of the Interior Thomas de Maizière, showed that there were 61 Turkish gangs in Germany. According to the report, alongside their more traditional fields of drug smuggling, gangs are also increasingly turning their attention to burglary, car theft, and fraud. 10% of Germany's gang members were reported to be Turkish and according to statistics, the activity of Turkish gangs in Germany had decreased.

In 2016, Die Welt and Bild reported that the new Turkish motorbike gang, Osmanen Germania, was growing rapidly. The newspaper Hannoversche Allgemeine Zeitung claimed that the Osmanen Germania was advancing more and more into the red-light districts, which increases the likelihood of a bloody territorial battle with established gangs like the Hells Angels Motorcycle Club and the Mongols Motorcycle Club. The gang was banned in 2018 and dissolved.

==== Afghan gangs ====
Afghan clans are active in Hamburg, a city with a large Afghan population. Like the Turkish as well as Albanian gangs in the city, Afghan organized crime is active in hashish and heroin trafficking, extortion and prostitution.

==== Moroccan gangs ====
Moroccan organized crime groups, have been reported in Frankfurt. Next to the Serbian mafia and Balkan gangs, the Moroccan organized crime has become one of the active main players in the Frankfurt underworld for heroin trade as well as other criminal activities.

=== Vietnamese crime groups ===
Vietnamese groups active in human trafficking and cigarette smuggling have been reported in Germany. Chinese Triads on the other hand have also been reported but don't seem to have substantial power in Germany.

== Corruption ==
Transparency International’s Global corruption barometer 2013 revealed that political parties and businesses are the most corrupt institutions in Germany. The same report also indicated that petty corruption is not as uncommon as other European countries. The survey showed that 11% of the respondents claim to have been asked to pay a bribe at one point in their life and only a few of those said that they had refused to pay the bribe.

== By nationality ==
Share of foreign nationals among 2017 crime suspects
Pickpocketing	74.4%
Forgery of official documents	55.4%
Burglaries	41.3%
Rapes and sexual assaults	37%
All types	34.7%
Social benefit fraud	34.1%
Murder and manslaughter	29.7%
Share of population	12%
Source: Wall Street Journal

In 2018, The Wall Street Journal analyzed German crime statistics for crime suspects and found that the foreigners, overall 12.8% of the population, make up a disproportionate share of crime suspects (34.7%), see horizontal bar chart.

In 2016, 31.4% of all convicted offenders were foreigners, about 3 times higher than the percentage of foreigners living in Germany.

According to The Huffington Post in February 2018, out of each of the 15 state justice ministries, 12,300 Muslims are in prison. This constitutes about 20% of the 65,000 prison population in Germany, proving to be an over-representation. The highest shares are in city states of Bremen (29%), Hamburg (28%) but the share is high also in large states such as Hessen (26%) Baden-Württemberg (26%). The share is lower in the former East Germany.

In 2018, the interior ministry published an analysis of the Federal Police Statistic (PKS) for the first time, which included all the people who came via the asylum system into Germany. The report found that the group defined as immigrants, which constitutes 2% of the total population, makes up 8.5% of all crime suspects.

== By location ==
Crimes such as drug trafficking, weapon trafficking, extortion, prostitution, money laundering and contract killing are mostly present in poorly maintained areas of urban centers such as Berlin, Frankfurt, Hamburg, Hannover, Duisburg, Cologne or Düsseldorf.

== See also ==
- Human trafficking in Germany
- Immigration and crime in Germany
