= T in the Park 2005 =

Music festival in Scotland

T in the Park
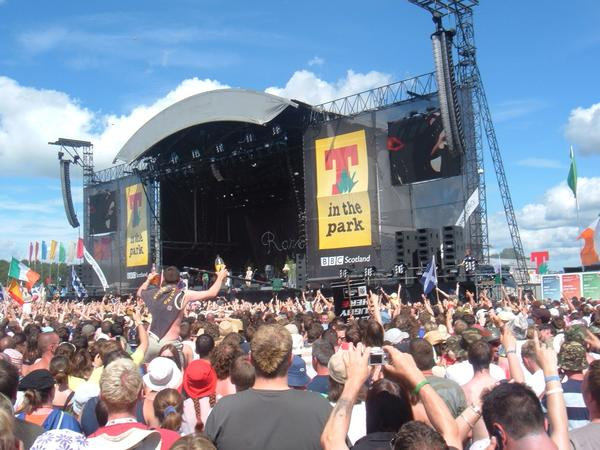
- 2005 Festival
- Dates: 9–10 July 2005
- Locations: Balado, Scotland, UK
- Years active: 1994 - 2014
- Website: https://tinthepark.com/

T in the Park 2005 is a weekend music festival which took place from 9–10 July 2005 in Balado, Kinross.

== Tickets ==
Tickets for the 2005 event sold out in record time, just four days after going on sale, five months in advance of the festival. The event saw around 69,000 people a day watching more than 170 bands over 10 stages. It was named best festival in that year's UK Festival Awards, beating the Glastonbury Festival for the first time.

== Line up ==
Some of the bands performing included Green Day, who headlined Sunday night, Travis, The Killers, Keane, El Presidente, The Prodigy, New Order, Fightstar, James Brown, Echo & the Bunnymen, Two Lone Swordsmen, DJ Sneak, Richie Hawtin & Ricardo Villalobos, Sucioperro, Audioslave, Jimmy Eat World, Death From Above 1979, The Vale of Atholl Pipe Band, Eagles of Death Metal, Mylo, Athlete, Snoop Dogg, Queens of the Stone Age and Ian Brown. Saturday saw the return of the Foo Fighters, who came back to Scotland in dramatic style, headlining the main stage.

The 2005 line-up was as follows:

=== Main Stage ===
Saturday 9 July	Sunday 10 July
Foo Fighters; Keane; Embrace; The Killers; Audioslave; Joss Stone; The Beautiful South; Alabama 3	Green Day; Travis; Queens of the Stone Age; Snoop Dogg; Razorlight; Athlete; Biffy Clyro; Rachel Fuller

=== Radio 1/NME Stage ===
Saturday 9 July	Sunday 10 July
New Order; The Streets; The Coral; Jimmy Eat World; The La's; The Ordinary Boys; Maxïmo Park; Death from Above 1979; Fightstar	The Prodigy; Kasabian; Bloc Party; Kaiser Chiefs; The Bravery; The Vale of Atholl; Thirteen Senses; Eagles of Death Metal; Nine Black Alps; The Departure

=== King Tut's Tent ===
Saturday 9 July	Sunday 10 July
Doves; James Brown; The Futureheads; Dizzee Rascal; Rooster; Suzanne Vega; Do Me Bad Things; Poor Old Ben; Leya	Ian Brown; Interpol; Echo & the Bunnymen; Bright Eyes; KT Tunstall; Sons and Daughters; My Latest Novel; The Black Velvets; The Faint

=== X-Tent ===
Saturday 9 July	Sunday 10 July
Super Furry Animals; Brendan Benson; El Presidente; Josh Rouse; The Magic Numbers; The Duke Spirit; Aberfeldy; Cosmic Rough Riders; Battle; Blackbud; The Little Flames	The Tears; The Go! Team; The Stands; The Subways; The Dears; The Frames; yourcodenameis:milo; Countermine; Louis XIV; Cherubs

=== Slam Tent ===
Saturday 9 July	Sunday 10 July
LCD Soundsystem; Death In Vegas; Richie Hawtin vs Ricardo Villalobos; Miss Kittin; DJ Sneak; Kid Kenobi & MC Shureshock; Booka Shade; Silicone Soul; Jim Hutchinson	Mylo; Dave Clarke; Blackstrobe; Alter Ego (Live); Slam; Two Lone Swordsmen; Alex Smoke; The Bays; Ada; Butch Cassidy Soundsystem

=== Futures Stage ===
Saturday 9 July	Sunday 10 July
Tom Vek; The Cribs; Editors; The Rakes; Jackson United; Rilo Kiley; The Longcut; Leaves; Morning Runner; Humanzi; Envelopes; The Perishers	Art Brut; The Others; Hayseed Dixie; Dogs; The Paddingtons; Stephen Fretwell; Blue Van; Red Organ Serpent Sound; Engineers; Duels; Alterkicks; Tara Blaise

=== T Break Stage ===
Saturday 9 July	Sunday 10 July
Dead Fly Buchowski; Multiplies; Sluts of Trust; Sucioperro; All My Logic; Allergo; Aka the Fox; Drive-By Argument; Sleepmode; Thee Comrades; The Ronelles	Malcolm Middleton; Unkle Bob; The Cinematics; Jo Mango; Dragging the Lake; Fickle Public; Flying Matchstickmen; Staccato Set; The Very; Thisfamiliarsmile
