= Heart and Soul (Twin Atlantic song) =

Single by Twin Atlantic

from the album Great Divide
- Released: 25 May 2014
- Genre: Indie rock
- Length: 3:48
- Label: Red Bull
- Songwriter: Sam McTrusty
- Producer: Jacknife Lee

Twin Atlantic singles chronology
| "Yes, I Was Drunk" (2012) | "Heart and Soul" (2014) | "Brothers and Sisters" (2014) |

"Heart and Soul" is a song by Scottish rock band Twin Atlantic written by lead singer Sam McTrusty and co-written and produced by Jacknife Lee released as the first single from their 3rd studio album, Great Divide. It was released on 25 May 2014 and peaked at number 17 on the UK Singles Chart and number 4 on the Scottish Singles Chart.

== Background and production ==
The band started recording the song in May 2013 and it took almost a year to record as they were not content with the initial writing process. Sam McTrusty flew out to Los Angeles to collaborate on the process with Jacknife Lee and the rest of the band joined them at a later date. Lee had previously produced tracks for bands including R.E.M. and U2. Lead singer Sam told The Daily Record, “It was exactly what we needed. As soon as we got there the weight was lifted off. We realised this is how we were supposed to sound the last few years, we just couldn’t get there".

"Heart and Soul" was the last song written for their third album, "Great Divide", following up their 2011 album Free, with the initial writing process taking place in Wales. Sam said, "The writing process was spaced out and pieced together so it only truly became clear what the album was sounding like as a whole once we got into the recording studio. There was also a roller coaster effect of spending so long with certain songs and in the studio that the love affair with parts, sections or riff and lyrics could be very up and down. That all resulted in a self-reflection and reviewing, which allowed us to be a bit more critical once we reached the end of our recording in Wales. There was a definite moment of us all agreeing that the album was good but an uncertainty if it was great, so we decided there would be no harm in finding out if we could push it further."

== Music video ==
The description of the music video on the Red Bull Records website reads, "Constantly scrolling like an old video game, the official music video for Twin Atlantic's Heart and Soul plays with perspective and makes use of shapes, colours and disembodied singing heads". The video was directed by Jonas Odell, who had conducted projects with Goldfrapp, U2 and The Rolling Stones, and helmed the Grammy-nominated visuals for Franz Ferdinand's 2004 hit single "Take Me Out". Sam said that they originally had a simple concept but Odell had convinced them to "literally throw everything at it. All we knew when we went into shoot the video is that the film would be scrolling to the right and that various graphics would be used". As of October 2020 the video has almost 3.1 million views on the Vevo music video on YouTube.

== Release and promotion ==
The song received its worldwide premiere and radio debut on Zane Lowe's show on BBC Radio 1 on 31 March 2014 as his 'Hottest Record in the World'. The band got together at band member Ross McNae's house to hear the song being premiered. It was subsequently added to Radio 1's "A" playlist, the station's primary playlist for the most popular contemporary tracks.

The band performed "Heart and Soul" on the John Peel Stage at Glastonbury Festival in 2014. They followed this up later that summer with another performance of the song at T in the Park and finished the festival season at Reading Festival. They announced a UK tour starting in October 2014, where they played their new album tracks including "Heart and Soul" across the country.

== Awards ==
"Heart and Soul" was awarded 'Best Independent Track' at the 2014 Association of Independent Music Awards.

== Chart performance ==
"Heart and Soul" entered the UK Singles Chart at its peak position of number 17, spending one more week in the top 40 and a further three weeks in the top 100. This was their highest charting single in the UK to date, with their previous entry "Free" only reaching number 99 in January 2012. It also peaked at number 4 on the Scottish Singles Chart in the week ending 7 June 2014. By January 2020 the song had also been streamed more than 18 million times on Spotify. The song also hit number-one on the UK Rock Chart and number two on the UK Indie Chart. Additionally it secured a number 35 placing on the US Alternative Songs countdown and number 14 on the Mexico Ingles Airplay chart.

Its parent album peaked at number 6 on the UK Album Chart, becoming their second top 10 album in the UK, and also topped the Scottish Albums Chart.

== Charts ==
| Chart (2014) | Peak position |
|---|---|
| Scottish Singles Sales (Official Charts) | 4 |
| UK Singles (Official Charts) | 17 |
| UK Indie (Official Charts) | 2 |
| UK Rock & Metal (Official Charts) | 1 |
| US Alternative Songs (Billboard) | 35 |

== Certifications ==
| Region | Certification | Certified units/sales |
|---|---|---|
| United Kingdom (BPI) | Silver | 200,000^{‡} |
^{‡} Sales+streaming figures based on certification alone.
