= One Records =

One Records may refer to:

- One Records (Scotland), a record label based in Scotland
- One Records (Serbia), a record label based in Serbia
