= Without You (El Presidente song) =

Single by El Presidente

from the album El Presidente (album)
- Released: 25 July 2005
- Recorded: 2005
- Genre: Glam rock
- Length: 3:36
- Label: One Records
- Songwriters: Dante Gizzi, Giuliano Gizzi
- Producer: El Presidente

El Presidente singles chronology
"100MPH" (2005)	"Without You" (2005)	""Rocket" re-issue" (2005)

"Without You" is the third single from the band El Presidente that became their biggest hit to date. It reached number 30 on the British singles chart. One of the reasons for its success was heavy promotion upon its release. From its release on 25 July 2006, there was a Top of the Pops performance, a TRL performance, an article in The Sun, a live session on The Dermot O'Leary Show on BBC Radio 2 (on which they performed Without You, and Raspberry Beret), and an Xfm session (taped in May 2006, on which they performed "Without You", "100MPH", and "Hanging Around").

In Japan, the single entered the chart via import at number 46, then rose as high as number 9.

In 2008, the song was included in the soundtrack of the film Made of Honor.
