= Turn This Thing Around =

2006 single by El Presidente

Single by El Presidente

from the album El Presidente
- Released: 6 February 2006
- Recorded: 2005
- Genre: Disco, glam rock
- Length: 3:43
- Label: One Records
- Songwriters: Dante Gizzi, Giuliano Gizzi
- Producer: El Presidente

El Presidente singles chronology
"Rocket" (2005)	"Turn This Thing Around" (2006)

"Turn This Thing Around" is a single by El Presidente released on 6 February 2006.

When originally featured on their debut album, it featured Alan Thorton on drums, but was re-recorded in late 2005 with the official El Presidente line-up. The new version has a more Japanese sound to it, and the video was also shot in Japan.

When released, two live versions from the Xfm Scotland opening gig, and Edinburgh liquid rooms were made available through the official El Presidente website. On the Monday of its release, it was at number 30 in the midweek chart, but slipped down each day and fell to number 39 by Sunday.

== Track listings ==
=== First CD ===
1. "Turn This Thing Around"
2. "Raspberry Beret"

=== Second CD ===
1. "Turn This Thing Around"
2. "Get By"
3. "Turn This Thing Around" (acoustic)

=== Coloured (Red) 7" ===
A. "Turn This Thing Around" B. "Rocket" (acoustic)

== Charts ==
No.39/79---England No.11 Gone---Scotland No.94 Gone---Japan

== EP version ==
"Turn This Thing Around EP"

Single by El Presidente

from the album El Presidente (album)
- Released: April 5, 2006
- Recorded: 2005
- Genre: Disco, glam rock
- Label: One Records
- Songwriters: Dante Gizzi, Giuliano Gizzi
- Producer: El Presidente

El Presidente singles chronology
"Turn This Thing Around" (2006)	"Turn This Thing Around EP" (2006)

A Japanese release, this EP features B-Sides, two versions of "Turn This Thing Around" (new and old) and the Japanese-flavoured video. It was an official Japanese release, but only reached number 94 in the singles chart in Japan.
