= Jonas Odell =

Swedish music video and film director

Jonas Odell (born 10 November 1962 in Stockholm) is a Swedish music video and film director and founder of FilmTecknarna. Odell, who specializes in a mix of animation and live action, has directed a number of short films, music videos and commercials. His short film Never Like the First Time! (Aldrig som första gången!) was awarded the Golden Bear for best short film in the Berlin International Film Festival 2006. He has won two Swedish Guldbagge Awards for Best Short Film, for Never Like the First Time! (2006) and Lies (Lögner) (2008). Lies also received the Jury Prize for International Short Filmmaking at the 2009 Sundance Film Festival.

== Videos ==
- "Groovies" (1998) shorts for Cartoon Network
- "Come Up and See Me" (2003) video for Erasure
- "Strict Machine" (2003) video for Goldfrapp
- "Take Me Out" (2004) video for Franz Ferdinand
- "Smile" (2004) video for Mad Action
- "Rocket" (2004) video for El Presidente
- "Changes" (2004) video for Tahiti 80
- "Feeling a Moment" (2005) video for Feeder
- "Shot You Down" (2005) video for Audiobullys
- "Smile" (2006) video for The Cobbs
- "Window in the Skies" (2006) video for U2
- "Ali in the Jungle" (2007) video for The Hours
- "Paper Planes" (2008) video for I'm From Barcelona
- "I Like You So Much Better When You're Naked" (2009) video for Ida Maria
- "Plundered My Soul" (2010) video for The Rolling Stones
- "Right Action" (2013) video for Franz Ferdinand
- "Heart and Soul" (2014) video for Twin Atlantic

== Selected films ==
- Exit (1990) codirected with Stig Bergkvist, Marti Ekstrand & Lars Olsson
- Revolver (1993) codirected with Stig Bergkvist, Marti Ekstrand & Lars Olsson
- Body Parts (1994)
- Otto (1996)
- Family & Friends (2002)
- Never Like the First Time! (2006)
- Lies (2008)
- Tussilago (2010)
- I Was a Winner (2019)

== Compilations ==
- "Alla talar svenska!" (DVD 2007) codirected with Stig Bergkvist, Marti Ekstrand & Lars Olsson
