= 100 MPH =

Single by El Presidente

from the album El Presidente
- Released: 2 May 2005
- Recorded: 2005
- Genre: Glam rock
- Length: 3:37
- Label: One Records
- Songwriter(s): Dante Gizzi, Giuliano Gizzi
- Producer(s): El Presidente

El Presidente singles chronology
"Rocket" (2005)	"100 MPH" (2005)	"Without You" (2005)

"100 MPH" is a song by El Presidente from their debut album El Presidente (2005). It was released as a single on two formats, CD and Yellow 7". It reached number 37 in the UK Singles Chart, although in the midweek chart it was at number 34.

After the band performed "100 MPH" on GMTV, Liam Gallagher approached lead singer Dante Gizzi and enquired about who produced it. Gallagher was shocked when Gizzi replied saying he recorded it in his bedroom for a mere £100. Gallagher was impressed by the band so much that he asked them to support Oasis on their Scottish leg of their UK tour.

They also performed the single on Top of the Pops Saturday, and CD:UK.

== Chart performance ==
Chart (2005)	Peak position
UK Singles (OCC)	37
