= Rocket (El Presidente song) =

2005 single by El Presidente

Single by El Presidente

from the album El Presidente (album)
- Released: 31 January 2005
- Recorded: 2004
- Genre: Glam rock
- Length: 3:37
- Label: One Records
- Songwriters: Dante Gizzi, Giuliano Gizzi
- Producer: El Presidente

El Presidente singles chronology
"Rocket" (2005)	"100MPH" (2005)

"Rocket"

Single by El Presidente

from the album El Presidente (album)
- Released: 10 October 2005
- Recorded: 2005
- Genre: Glam rock
- Length: 3:46
- Label: One Records
- Songwriters: Dante Gizzi, Giuliano Gizzi
- Producer: El Presidente

El Presidente singles chronology
"Without You" (2005)	"Rocket" (2005)	"Turn This Thing Around" (2006)

"Rocket" is the first single from El Presidente. It was a limited (1000 copies) red 10" vinyl release. The B-side was Rocket-Beef Music Mix. It reached number 37 on the UK Singles Chart.

Not much is known about when the song was recorded or who plays on it apart from Liam Nugent (Das Bold) is credited as backing vocals, and Ross Galloway (Roscoe P. Coltrane) is credited as Synths.

The video for the song, directed by Jonas Odell, cost around £20,000 to produce. The music video of the song is one of those available on the PlayStation Portable demo disc.

The song was used on football programmes on Sky Sports in the background when the matches that were being shown that week were said.

== Re-issue ==
"Rocket" was re-released as El Presidente's fourth single on 10 October 2005 on CD and purple 7". With little airplay and television exposure, the single only scraped to number 48 in the singles chart, and the album that followed two weeks later reached number 57.

There was no new video shot for this re-release; the original "Rocket" video directed by Jonas Odell was re-edited.

However, "Rocket" was re-recorded for this release. Jeremy Wheatley was stated on the back cover as Programmer, assisted by Richard Edgeler. Three new B-sides appeared on the release:

- "Hold On"
- "Alone As I Am"
- "Say Goodbye"

These were all written by Dante Gizzi/Joolz Gizzi.

== Charts ==
Chart (2005)	Peak position
UK Singles (OCC)	48
