= GLA (album) =

Studio album by Twin Atlantic
- Released: 9 September 2016
- Genre: Alternative rock
- Label: Red Bull Records
- Producer: Jacknife Lee

Twin Atlantic chronology
Great Divide (2014)	GLA (2016)	Power (2020)

GLA is the fourth studio album by Scottish alternative rock band Twin Atlantic. It was released on 9 September 2016. The album was produced by Jacknife Lee.

On 2 September 2016 Annie Mac premiered lead single "No Sleep" as the Hottest Record in the World on BBC Radio 1. On 16 September 2016, GLA became the band's second top 10 charting album in the UK, debuting at No. 9 on the UK album charts, No. 1 on the Rock Album Charts and No. 3 on the Scottish album charts

== Reception ==
Professional ratings
Aggregate scores
Source	Rating
Metacritic	81/100
Review scores
Source	Rating
NME	4/5
Clash	7/10
The Line of Best Fit	6.5/10

The album was included at number 10 on Kerrang!'s "The Top 50 Rock Albums Of 2016" list.

== Track listing ==
No.	Title	Length
1.	"Gold Elephant: Cherry Alligator"	2:58
2.	"No Sleep"	3:47
3.	"You Are The Devil"	3:10
4.	"Overthinking"	3:09
5.	"Ex El"	5:40
6.	"Valhalla"	4:33
7.	"I Am Alive"	3:47
8.	"Whispers"	5:40
9.	"A Scar To Hide"	3:57
10.	"Missing Link"	3:20
11.	"The Chaser"	4:06
12.	"Mothertongue"	3:09

== Charts ==
Chart (2016)	Peak position
UK Albums (OCC)	9
Scottish Albums (OCC)	3
Belgian Albums (Ultratop Wallonia)	167
