= Lies (2008 film) =

Lies is a 2008 animated documentary short directed by Jonas Odell of Sweden. It won the Sundance Film Festival's 2009 Jury Prize for International Short Filmmaking.

The plot involves three stories based on interviews Odell collected and the consequences of lying. In the first, a con-man steals from his place of employment, having to lie for salvation. In the second, a student steals from his mother. In the third, a woman, addicted to drugs, lies her way through life, ultimately realizing she can't pretend to be someone she wasn't in the end.

The film was produced by Odell's company Filmtarkana and was celebrated for its mastery, aesthetics and creativity.
