= Helge Skoog =

Swedish actor and comedian (1938–2025)

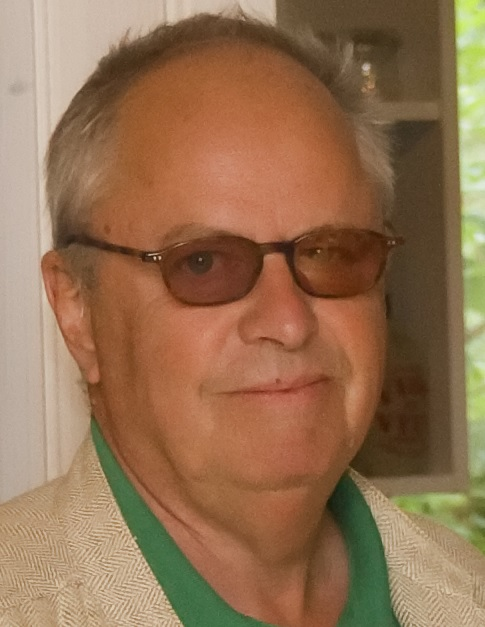
- Skoog in 2013
- Born: 6 August 1938; Borås, Sweden
- Died: 12 December 2025 (aged 87)
- Occupations: Actor, comedian

Helge Skoog (6 August 1938 – 12 December 2025) was a Swedish actor and comedian, who became well known during the 1980s appearing on the television series Teatersport. During the 2000s, he took part in the television programme Parlamentet.

From February to March 2015, he acted as the narrator voice in the television programme Klockan nio hos stjärnorna.

Skoog was married to Busk Margit Jonsson from 1964 to 1977. He died on 12 December 2025, at the age of 87.

== Filmography ==
- 1970 – Baltutlämningen
- 1976 – Near and Far Away
- 1981 – Babels hus (TV)
- 1981 – Beteendelek (TV play)
- 1984 – Pengarna gör mannen (TV film)
- 1985 – Skrotnisse och hans vänner (voice actor)
- 1986 – Fläskfarmen
- 1986 – Bröderna Mozart
- 1988 – Allra käraste syster
- 1989 – T. Sventon praktiserande privatdetektiv
- 1990 – Exit (voice actor)
- 2000 – Jönssonligan spelar högt
- 2005 – Kommissionen (TV series)
- 2008–2013 – Halv åtta hos mig (TV series) (narrator)
