= Mahmoud Al-Zein =

Lebanese-German crime boss (born 1966)

Mahmoud al-Zein (Arabic: محمود الزين) nicknamed "The godfather of Berlin" is regarded as one of the most powerful crime lords in Germany. The al-Zein Clan, is believed to have many members, possibly up to 15000, and it is one of the most feared families among the Mhallami Crime Families.

Al-Zein has contacts throughout Europe and the Middle East.

== Biography ==
Al-Zein arrived with his wife in Germany in 1982. He is of Mhallami-Kurdish descent. Later investigations by a special police task force established that he was born 1966 in Anatolia under the name of Mahmoud Uca (first name also written Mahmud or Mahmut). He is believed to hold Syrian, Lebanese or Turkish citizenship, but the situation is unclear as he could possibly be stateless, continuing to hamper ongoing attempts to deport him.

In 2006, Berlin daily newspaper Tagesspiegel wrote that during a trial "El Presidente" had claimed his real name was Mahaiddine Al-Zein, born in Beirut in 1966, of Kurdish-Lebanese descent. Meanwhile the state prosecutor maintained Mahmoud Al-Zein was born under the name Mahmut Uca in Turkey in 1972. German investigators had found out that Mahmoud's father who - like his son - lived in Germany on state benefits, was registered in the village of Üçkavak (this village is also known under its former Arabic name Rajdiye/Al-Rashdiye) in Mardin Province, close to the border with Syria. Mahmut Uca was being stripped of his Turkish citizenship on February 13, 2002. However, "El Presidente" denied all this and told the court he didn't know anything about a Turkish citizenship.

In March 2008, Mahmoud Al-Zein was sentenced to 4 years and 3 month in prison for drug trafficking.

His claim for asylum was already denied in 1984 and the decision upheld despite appeals in 1988 and 1992. Attempts to deport him to Turkey, following convictions for drug trafficking offences, failed after Turkey in 2002 officially stripped him of his Turkish citizenship, on the grounds that he allegedly dodged the obligatory military service in Turkey. On January 29, 2021, he left Berlin on a plane bound for Turkey, with a Turkish passport for Mahmut Uca. In 2002 Turkey confirmed that is registered under that name.

In 2024 Al-Zein filed a lawsuit against a 7-year entry ban Berlin had issued in 2021 and the Berlin Administrative Court allowed him to return to Berlin as soon as summer 2025.

== Personal life and family ==
Al-Zein is married and has 10 children. Officially, Mahmoud Al-Zein makes a living out of drawing German unemployment benefits (Arbeitslosengeld).

He has a brother named Youssef Elzein who was a bodybuilder and a champion of Lebanon seven times. Mahmoud's nephew Muhammed "Hamudi" Ali Al-Zein, 26-year-old son of Mahmoud's brother Ali al-Zein, who came in 1978 as a refugee from Lebanon to Germany, is a young promising heavyweight boxer from Düsseldorf. In 2015 he became WBC Mediterranean champion.

Another nephew of Mahmoud, Mohamed Hassan Al-Zein, paid tribute to his uncle saying that Mahmoud is a role model for him and called his uncle a legend. His admiration culminated with the statement 'Best uncle in the world'.
