= Power (Twin Atlantic album) =

Studio album by Twin Atlantic
- Released: 24 January 2020
- Genre: Alternative rock
- Length: 34:17
- Label: Virgin EMI
- Producer: Dan Austin; Ross McNae; Sam McTrusty

Twin Atlantic chronology
GLA (2016)	Power (2020)	Transparency (2022)

Power is the fifth studio album by Scottish alternative rock band Twin Atlantic. It was released on 24 January 2020.

== Track listing ==
All tracks are written by Twin Atlantic

Power track listing
No.	Title	Length
1.	"Oh! Euphoria!"	3:42
2.	"Barcelona"	4:36
3.	"Novocaine"	3:28
4.	"Mount Bungo"	0:42
5.	"I Feel It Too"	3:57
6.	"Ultraviolet Truth"	4:46
7.	"Asynchronous"	2:04
8.	"Volcano"	3:52
9.	"Messiah"	3:59
10.	"Praise Me"	3:21
Total length:		34:27

== Critical reception ==
Professional ratings
Aggregate scores
Source	Rating
Metacritic	61/100
Review scores
Source	Rating
DIY	2/5 stars
The Guardian	3/5 stars
Kerrang!	3/5 stars
NME	2/5 stars

Power was met with generally favorable reviews from critics. At Metacritic, which assigns a weighted average rating out of 100 to reviews from mainstream publications, this release received an average score of 61, based on 6 reviews.

== Charts ==
Chart performance for Power
Chart (2020)	Peak position
Scottish Albums (OCC)	1
UK Albums (OCC)	11

== See also ==
- List of 2020 albums
