= Twin Atlantic =

Scottish band

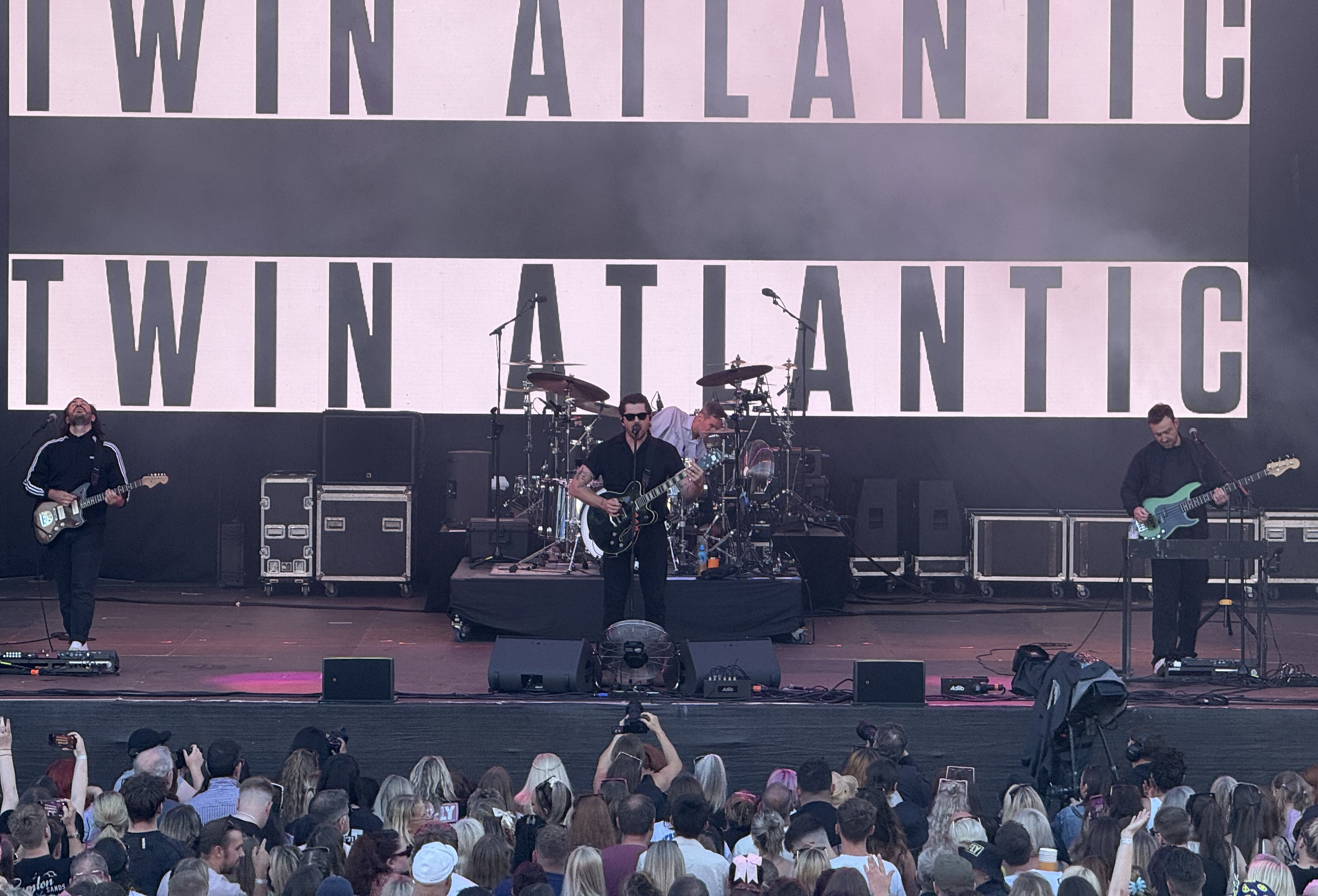

Background information
- Origin: Glasgow, Scotland
- Genres: Alternative rock; power pop; emo pop; indie rock
- Years active: 2007–present
- Labels: Red Bull; Virgin EMI
- Members: Sam McTrusty; Ross McNae
- Past members: Joe Lazarus
- Website: twinatlantic.com

Twin Atlantic are a Scottish alternative rock band from Glasgow. The group currently consists of Sam McTrusty (lead vocals, rhythm guitar) and Ross McNae (bass). Lead guitarist Barry McKenna departed from the band in 2019, but continues to perform with the band at their live shows. They have released seven albums: Vivarium, Free, Great Divide, GLA, Power, Transparency and Meltdown. Their highest-charting single is "Heart and Soul" from Great Divide, which peaked at number 17 on the UK Singles Chart. On 2 June 2016, Annie Mac premiered "No Sleep" as the Hottest Record in the World on BBC Radio 1 and announced their album GLA, subsequently released on 9 September 2016.

== History ==
=== Formation, A Guidance from Colour (2006–2008) ===
Twin Atlantic formed in 2006. All members previously played in other small local bands. Twin Atlantic before recording their debut EP A Guidance from Colour at Long Wave Studio in Cardiff with producer Romesh Dodangoda. They released a single, "Audience & Audio", on 24 December 2007, and the debut EP on 14 January 2008. The band signed a single deal with King Tut's Recordings, and "What Is Light? Where Is Laughter?" was released on 29 September 2008.

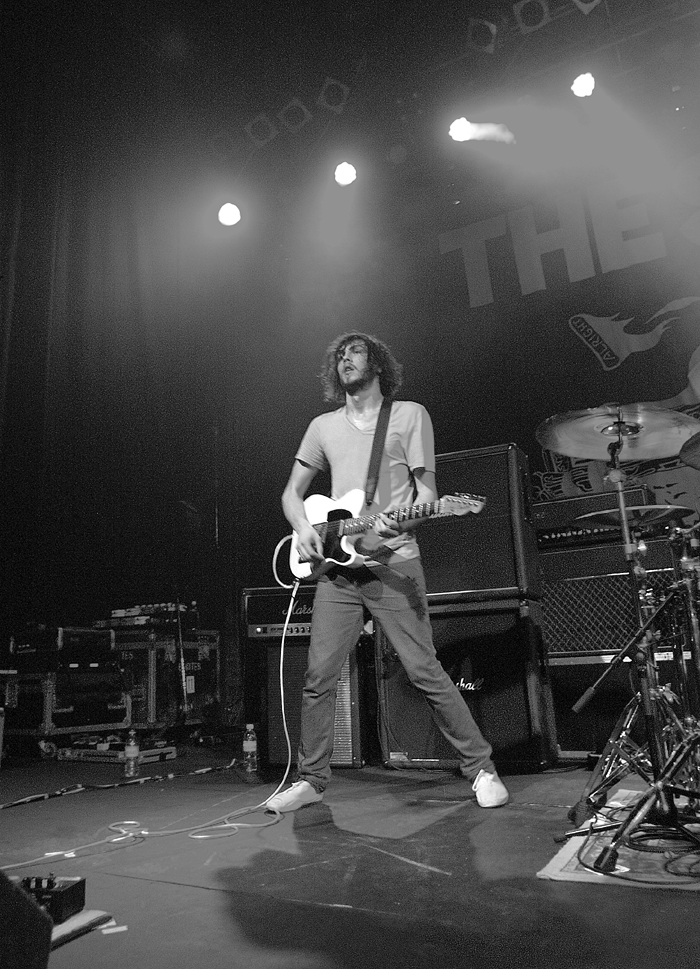
Barry McKenna, then of Twin Atlantic, in Glasgow 2008

They also completed a joint headline tour of Scotland with the Xcerts and their first set of solo headline dates across the UK.

=== Vivarium (2009–2010) ===
In March 2009, Twin Atlantic released their debut mini-album, Vivarium. They released the lead single "Lightspeed" as a free download from their website on 29 July 2009, with a bonus acoustic version of the track also available. The follow-up single "You're Turning Into John Wayne" was released on 7 September 2009, with the mini-album released a week later.

On 7 March 2009, they played a sold-out gig at Queen Margaret Union (QMU).

The band toured extensively in 2009 and 2010, having played Download Festival, Guilfest, T in the Park, Sonisphere and Belladrum over the summer of 2009, including supporting Taking Back Sunday on a tour of the UK and Ireland in July 2009. This continued into a full tour of the UK in September and then the United States with the Fall of Troy and Envy On The Coast in March and April 2010. In June 2010, Twin Atlantic supported the Gaslight Anthem on their British mini-tour and on 7 August 2010 they played at the Hevy Music Festival.

Twin Atlantic played at the sold-out Belsonic festival in Belfast on 28 August 2010 supporting Biffy Clyro.

Following a sold-out show at Glasgow's ABC, they landed the dream slot of supporting Blink-182 on their reunion tour in Scotland in August 2010.

On 21 October 2010, the band announced, that they would be supporting My Chemical Romance for three upcoming dates.

=== Free (2011–2013) ===
Twin Atlantic finished recording their album Free and it was released on 29 April 2011 in the Republic of Ireland and 2 May 2011 in the United Kingdom.

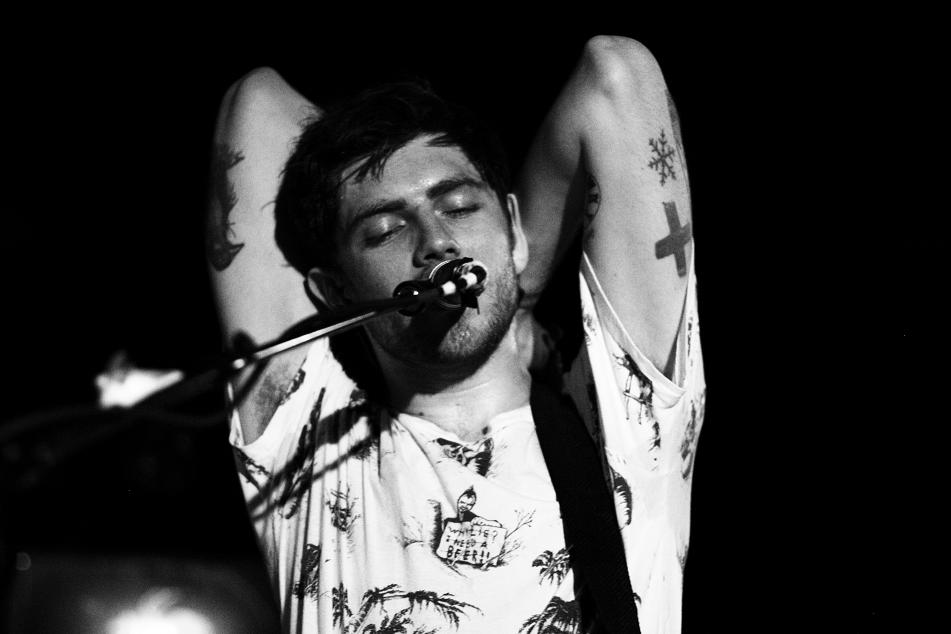
Singer/guitarist Sam McTrusty at The Viper Room, 2012

The album's first single was "Edit Me", released on 14 February.

Second single "Free" was first played on BBC Radio 1 on the Zane Lowe show on 10 March. The third single released was "Time For You To Stand Up" on 11 July, with "Cherry Slut" and "Babylonian Throwdown" as B-sides. On 26 September, a fourth single was released from the album; "Make A Beast Of Myself", including the B-side "Your Amazing Lying, Lion, Lie In".

In the summer of 2012, the band was on the Vans Warped Tour. Twin Atlantic also supported Blink-182 again in some venues on their UK tour alongside the All-American Rejects.

A remix of their single, "Free", was used for the closing of the Discovery Channel's coverage of the 2012 Red Bull Stratos space jump by Felix Baumgartner.

Their song "Crash Land" was featured in the British film Not Another Happy Ending in 2013.

=== Great Divide (2014–2015) ===
Twin Atlantic released their album Great Divide in August 2014. In February 2014, Twin Atlantic joined Thirty Seconds to Mars on the second part of their European Arena tour.

On 31 March 2014 Zane Lowe premiered "Heart and Soul" as the Hottest Record in the World on BBC Radio 1. The track won the award for 'Best Independent Track' at the 2014 Association of Independent Music Awards.

On 23 April 2014 the band's third studio album Great Divide was announced, with a release date of 18 August 2014.

Twin Atlantic did a four-date tour in support of the album, playing Brixton Academy in London and they sold out their hometown show at Glasgow's SSE Hydro. During the summer of 2015, the band performed at several festivals including Glastonbury Festival and T in the Park festival at the new site at Strathallan Castle. The band headlined the BBC Radio 1 Stage on Saturday at T in the Park 2015. They concluded their album campaign at Reading and Leeds Festival in August 2015.

The last single from the album campaign was "Fall into the Party", the official video included highlights of the previous 18 months promoting the album at several gigs, festivals, and their massive headline show at The SSE Hydro.

The band were nominated as finalists for Best Live Act 2015 by the Association of Independent Music. Twin Atlantic were named 'Best UK Band' at the 2016 SSE Scottish Music Awards.

=== GLA (2016–2019) ===
Twin Atlantic released their fourth studio album, GLA, on 9 September 2016. The tracks "Gold Elephant: Cherry Alligator" and "No Sleep" were released on 3 June. Annie Mac premiered "No Sleep" as the Hottest Record in the World on BBC Radio 1. On 7 July 2016, Zane Lowe premiered the track "Ex El" on his Beats 1 radio show.

The second single from the album "The Chaser" was then premiered by Annie Mac on Thursday 18 August 2016 on BBC Radio 1. They gave fans the opportunity to be involved in the music video, which was shot in Buff Club in Glasgow, the club where they played their first gig together.

The album was produced by Jacknife Lee in Los Angeles. GLA is the airport code for the band's hometown, Glasgow. They made their BBC national TV debut on Later... with Jools Holland on 4 October 2016 performing three songs "No Sleep", "The Chaser" and "Ex El".

They then embarked on several tours in support of the album, taking them around the UK and Europe, including a run of three nights at the renowned Barrowland Ballroom in their native Glasgow.

As of September 2017, Twin Atlantic were writing new music, which they hoped to release shortly thereafter.

=== Power (2020) ===
Twin Atlantic announced their fifth studio album, Power, and simultaneously released the lead single, "Novocaine". In a Kerrang! interview speaking of the band's first new music since 2016's GLA, frontman Sam McTrusty said of "Novocaine": "I wanted to force myself to be more honest and open. The song tells the story of the most intimate connection I’ve ever felt with someone else: when I first met my wife. That feeling of obsession taking over every thought and reason was almost like an addiction at the time. It embarrasses us in some ways that we fell victim to such a clichéd movie script love story, but equally amazes us that it ever happened."

They have a UK intimate tour lined up for 2020 with the album releasing on 24 January 2020.

=== Transparency and Kneale's departure (2021–2022) ===
In September 2021, drummer Craig Kneale released a statement via social media announcing his departure from the band, and the band subsequently announced their sixth album Transparency, which was released on 7 January 2022. Release shows were delayed until March.

=== Free (10th anniversary - 2022) ===
On 17 January 2022, Twin Atlantic announced a May tour for the 10th anniversary of Free The first pressing of the album on vinyl was released on 29 April 2022

=== Meltdown (2024) ===
Released digitally 9 August 2024. Physical release on 4 October 2024. Tour dates in November to support.

=== Summer 2025 ===
In May 2025, the single Salvation was released along with the news that Kneale would re-join the band as a touring member.

=== Separation from the Animals (2026) ===
At TRNSMT on 20 June, Twin Atlantic played a "secret set" under the moniker Triplet Pacific to announce the release of their eighth studio album on 2 October 2026. Days later a headline tour to support the album was announced for October 2026.

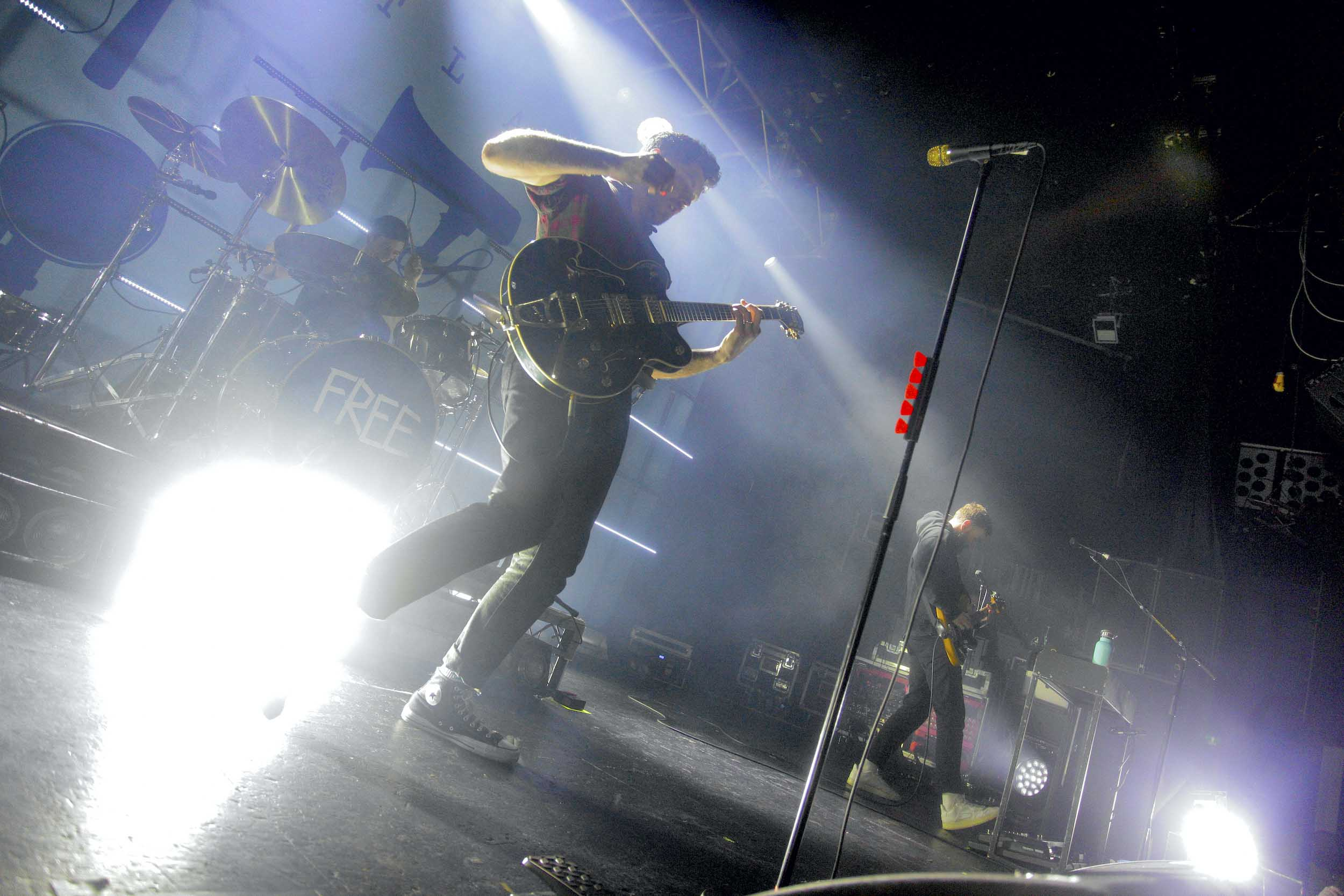
Twin Atlantic performing live in 2022

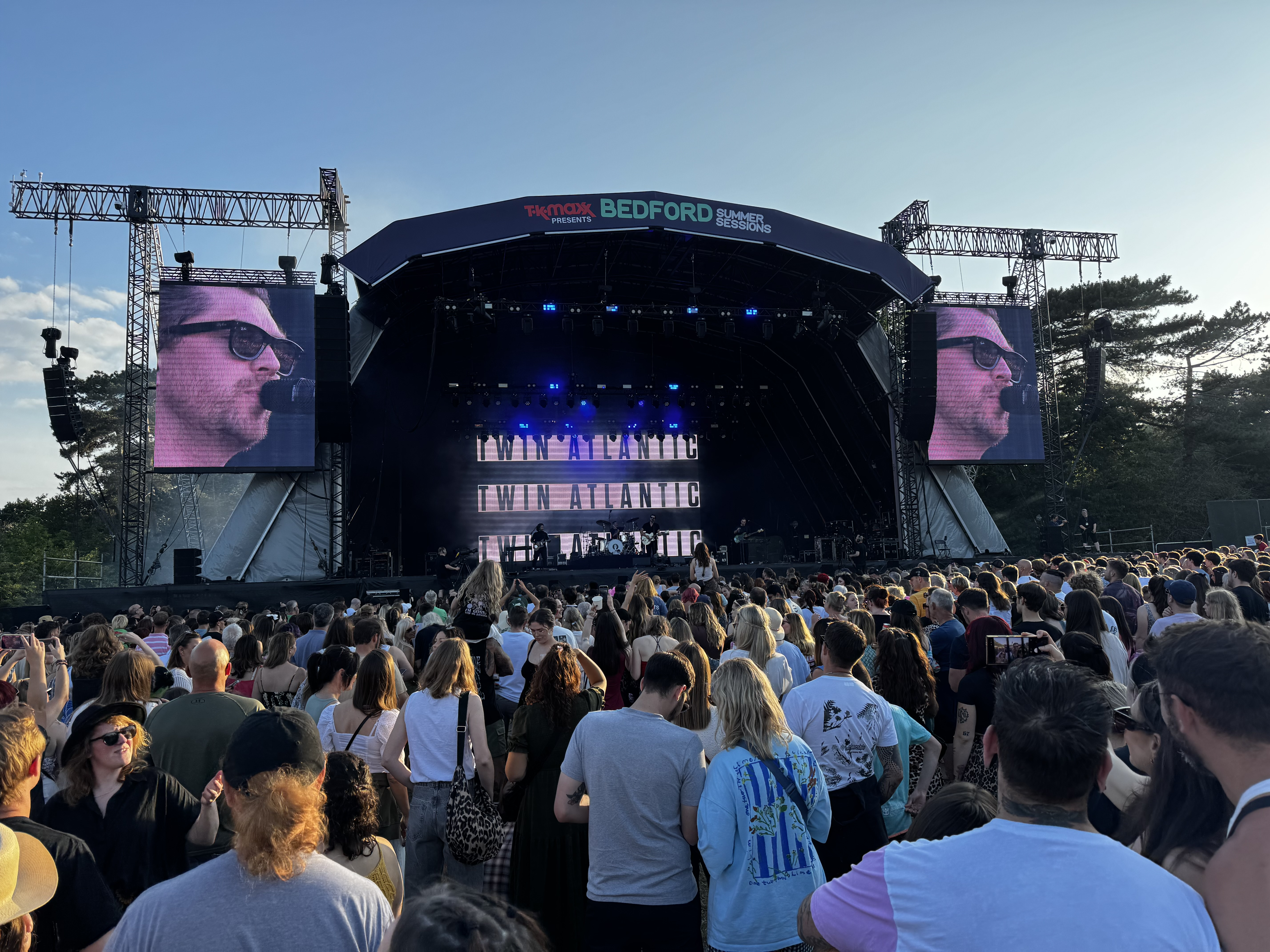
Twin Atlantic, supporting McFly in Bedford in 2025

== Musical style ==
Twin Atlantic's music has been described as alternative rock, power pop, emo pop, and indie rock. The band's influences include Blink-182, Nirvana, Rage Against the Machine, and Depeche Mode. McTrusty has also cited Bruce Springsteen's 1975 album Born to Run, Nirvana's 1991 record Nevermind, and Shellac's 1994 debut At Action Park as personal influences.

== Band members ==
Current

- Sam McTrusty – lead vocals, rhythm guitar (2007–present)
- Ross McNae – bass, keyboards, backing vocals (2007–present)

Former

- Joe Lazarus – drums (2021–2024)

Touring

- Barry McKenna – lead guitar, cello, keyboards, backing vocals. (Note: McKenna was originally a full-time member from 2007 before stepping down in 2019, albeit he continues to perform with the band onstage.)
- Craig Kneale – drums (2007–2021, 2025–present)

== Discography ==
=== Studio albums ===
| Title | Details | Peak chart positions | | | | | | Certifications |
| Title | Details | SCO | BEL (WA) | IRL | UK | UK Indie | UK Rock | Certifications |
|---|---|---|---|---|---|---|---|---|
| Vivarium | Released: 14 September 2009; Label: Red Bull; Formats: CD, digital download | 28 | — | — | 148 | 21 | — | |
| Free | Released: 29 April 2011; Label: Red Bull; Formats: CD, digital download | 4 | — | — | 37 | 5 | 1 | BPI: Gold |
| Great Divide | Released: 18 August 2014; Label: Red Bull; Formats: CD, digital download | 1 | — | 77 | 6 | 2 | 1 | BPI: Silver |
| GLA | Released: 9 September 2016; Label: Red Bull; Formats: CD, digital download | 3 | 167 | — | 9 | 2 | 1 | |
| Power | Released: 24 January 2020; Label: Virgin EMI; Formats: CD, vinyl, digital download | 1 | — | — | 11 | — | — | |
| Transparency | Released: 7 January 2022; Label: Believe; Formats: CD, vinyl, digital download | 1 | — | — | 27 | 1 | — | |
| Meltdown | Released: 9 August 2024; Label: Staple Diet; Formats: CD, vinyl, digital download | 8 | — | — | — | 16 | — | |
| Separation from the Animals | Released: 2 October 2026; Label: Dance to the Radio; Formats: CD, vinyl, digital download | 5 | — | — | — | 10 | — | |
"—" denotes a title that did not chart.

=== EPs ===
| Title | EP details |
|---|---|
| A Guidance from Colour | Released: 14 January 2008; Label: Staple Diet; Formats: CD, DL |
| Finch + Twin Atlantic Split EP | Released: 2009; Label: Red Bull; Formats: CD, DL |

=== Singles ===
| Title | Year | Peak chart positions | | | | | | | | Certifications | Album |
| Title | Year | SCO | AUT | BEL (FL) | MEX Air. | UK | UK Indie | UK Rock | US Alt. | Certifications | Album |
|---|---|---|---|---|---|---|---|---|---|---|---|
| "Audience and Audio" | 2007 | — | — | — | — | — | — | — | — | | A Guidance from Colour |
| "What Is Light? Where Is Laughter?" | 2008 | — | — | — | — | — | — | — | — | | Non-album single |
| "Lightspeed" | 2009 | 86 | — | — | — | — | — | — | — | | Vivarium |
| "What Is Light? Where Is Laughter?" (re-release) | 2009 | 43 | — | — | — | — | 35 | 18 | — | | Vivarium |
| "You're Turning Into John Wayne" | 2009 | — | — | — | — | — | — | — | — | | Vivarium |
| "Human After All" | 2010 | — | — | — | — | — | — | — | — | | Vivarium |
| "Edit Me" | 2011 | — | — | — | — | — | — | — | — | | Free |
| "Free" | 2011 | 43 | 28 | — | — | 99 | 13 | 2 | 29 | | Free |
| "Time for You to Stand Up" | 2011 | — | — | — | — | — | — | — | — | | Free |
| "Make a Beast of Myself" | 2011 | 58 | — | — | — | 129 | 9 | 2 | — | | Free |
| "Yes, I Was Drunk" | 2012 | — | — | — | — | — | 32 | 9 | — | | Free |
| "Heart and Soul" | 2014 | 4 | — | — | 14 | 17 | 2 | 1 | 35 | BPI: Silver | Great Divide |
| "Brothers and Sisters" | 2014 | 9 | — | — | — | 47 | 3 | 1 | — | | Great Divide |
| "Hold On" | 2014 | — | — | — | — | — | — | 34 | — | | Great Divide |
| "Oceans" | 2015 | — | — | — | — | — | — | — | — | | Great Divide |
| "Fall Into the Party" | 2015 | — | — | — | — | — | — | — | — | | Great Divide |
| "No Sleep" | 2016 | 54 | — | — (Note: "No Sleep" did not enter the Ultratop chart, but peaked at number 35 on the Ultratip chart.) | 39 | — | — | 15 | — | | GLA |
| "Gold Elephant: Cherry Alligator" | 2016 | — | — | — | — | — | — | — | — | | GLA |
| "Ex El" | 2016 | — | — | — | — | — | — | — | — | | GLA |
| "The Chaser" | 2016 | — | — | — | — | — | — | — | — | | GLA |
| "Mothertongue" | 2016 | — | — | — | — | — | — | — | — | | GLA |
"—" denotes a title that did not chart
