= El Presidente (album) =

2005 album by El Presidente

Studio album by El Presidente
- Released: 24 October 2005
- Recorded: Late 2004–early 2005
- Genre: Pop rock, glam rock
- Length: 44:18
- Label: Sony BMG
- Producer: El Presidente

El Presidente is the self-titled debut album from Scottish band El Presidente, released 24 October 2005. The album was also released on 8 February 2006 in Japan with two extra tracks, a new recording called "Lies" and a cover of Prince's "Raspberry Beret", which was also included as a B-side to "Turn This Thing Around". In total four singles have been released from the album, "Rocket", "100 MPH", "Without You" and "Turn This Thing Around".

The current line up of El Presidente is not actually featured on the album. It was recorded by Dante Gizzi and his brother Guiliano (Who played with Dante in the band Gun). Other guests on the album are Liam Nugent and Ross Galloway, who played synths and performed backing vocals respectively on the single "Rocket". Emma Murphy also performs backing vocals on "If You Say You Love Me", "Hanging Around" and "Old Times". Alan Thornton (also a former Gun member) drums on all tracks apart from the opening 3 tracks, and track 10. In the album's booklet it claims that Alan did indeed drum on the tenth track, but a recent investigation showed that the booklet was misprinted, and Dawn Zhu was the drummer. Zhu also plays on the opening three tracks.

Professional ratings
Review scores
Source	Rating
Allmusic	3.5/5 stars
The Observer	4/5 stars

El Presidente (Japan)

Studio album by El Presidente
- Released: 8 February 2006
- Recorded: 2004–2005
- Genre: Pop rock, glam rock
- Length: 44:56
- Label: One Records
- Producer: El Presidente

== Track listing ==
No.	Title	Length
1.	"Without You"	3:36
2.	"Rocket"	3:36
3.	"100 MPH"	3:35
4.	"Turn This Thing Around"	3:48
5.	"Count On Me"	3:20
6.	"If You Say You Love Me"	3:14
7.	"Hanging Around"	3:15
8.	"I Didn't Really"	3:56
9.	"Old Times"	3:53
10.	"Keep On Walking"	4:03
11.	"Honey"	3:59
12.	"Come On Now"	4:03

== Deluxe Edition ==
El Presidente (Deluxe Edition) was released with a bonus DVD.

=== Track listing ===
1. "Without You"
2. "Rocket"
3. "100 MPH"
4. "Turn This Thing Around"
5. "Count on Me"
6. "If You Say You Love Me"
7. "Hangin' Around"
8. "I Didn't Really"
9. "Old Times"
10. "Keep on Walking"
11. "Honey"
12. "Come on Now"
13. "Lies"
14. "Raspberry Beret"
15. "Sushi and Wine"
16. "How Many Roads"
17. "Hold On"

=== Bonus DVD ===
1. "Without You" (video)
2. "Rocket" (video)
3. "100 MPH" (video)
4. "Turn This Thing Around" (video)
5. The making of "Turn This Thing Around"
6. "Rocket" (live)
