= Halv åtta hos mig =

- Intertitle
- Starring: Morgan Alling
- Country of origin: Sweden
- No. of seasons: 5
- No. of episodes: 182

Production
- Running time: approx. 30 minutes (incl. adverts)

Original release
- Network: TV4
- Release: 6 October 2008 – present

Halv åtta hos mig (Swedish for Half past seven in my home) is a TV4 television programme shown in Sweden, first broadcast on 6 October 2008. The show is based on the ITV Studios television format Come Dine with Me broadcast on Channel 4 UK. The show has four amateur chefs competing against each other hosting a dinner party for the other contestants. Each competitor then rates the host's performance with the winner winning a 15,000 SEK cash prize. An element of comedy is added to the show through comedian Morgan Alling, who provides a sarcastic narration. The show was previously hosted by comedian Helge Skoog.

== Series 1: Autumn 2008 ==
Episodes	Premiered	Location	Contestants			
1–4	6 October 2008	Stockholm	Peter Barlach	Irenka Carlsson	Lisa Almgren	Khaled Bakkar
5–8	13 October 2008	Skåne	Mikael Håkansson	Valerie Thunell	Malin Lindell	Jens Holst
9–12	20 October 2008	Karlstad	Ingella Arwidsson	Jonas Langegård	Lena Marie Andersson	Joakim Näzell
13–16	3 November 2008	Stockholm	Mats Lindberg	Christina Estemars	Jolanta Bujak	Magnus Billström
17–20	10 November 2008	Jönköping	Noah Likhaya	Pelle Tengblad	Susanne Dalsätt	Lisa Lejon
21–24	17 November 2008	Gothenburg	Sara Vahlberg	Mattias Gereny	Sverker Toreskog	Anna Nelson
25–28	24 November 2008	Umeå	Niklas Gustafsson	Christer Johansson	Josefin Holmgren	Erik Wennberg
29–32	1 December 2008	Stockholm	Carlo Borsatti	Jeanette Predin	Mithras Ljungberg	Anni Bernhard

The last four episodes of the first series were shown over two weeks on 1, 2, 8 and 9 December 2008. The final episode had 373,000 viewers.

== Series 2: Spring 2009 ==
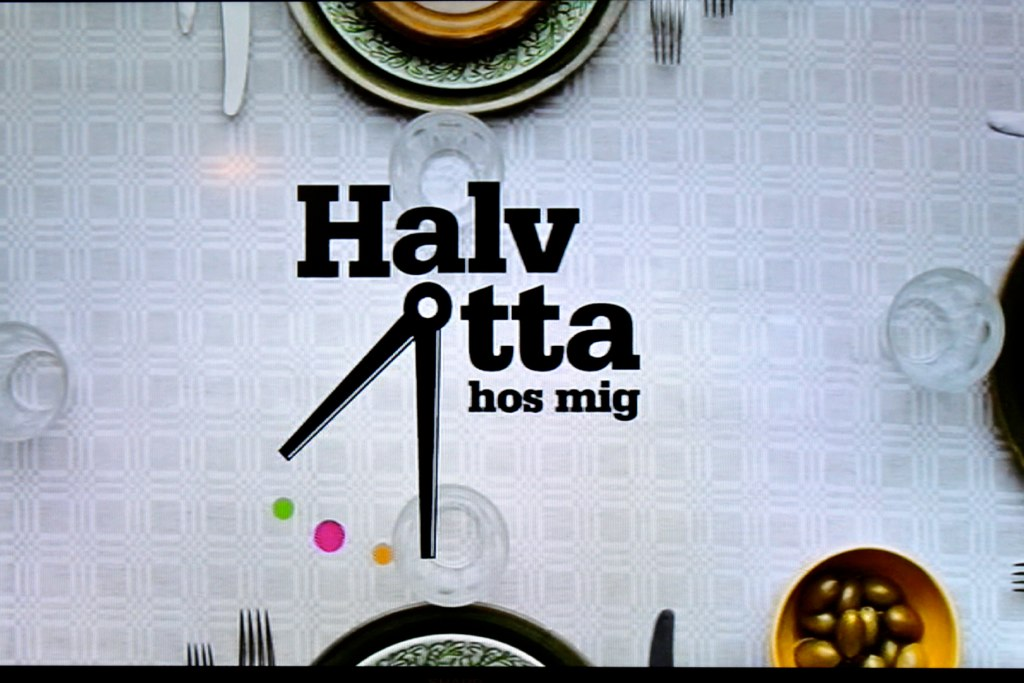
Intertitle

Episodes	Premiered	Location	Contestants			
1–4	2 February 2009	Stockholm	Johanna Figaro	Ardy Strüwer	Philip Hedberg	Usha Ananthakrishnan
5–8	9 February 2009	Linköping	Lars Mårelius	Björn Rallare	Elisabeth von Satzger	Willy Svahn
9–12	16 February 2009	Malmö	Christopher Larsson	Martin Wezowski	Rosemarie Geiss	Louise Karlsson
13–16	23 February 2009	Falun / Borlänge	Håkan Fåhraeus	Kerstin Sahlin	Kalle Fjällrud	Anna-Lena Strömmer
17–20	2 March 2009	Stockholm	Lena Helt	Arya Monfared	Philip Ajeenah	Mathias Kemi
21–24	9 March 2009	Gotland	Tomas Lönnhammar	Margaretha Olin	Josefin Ringbom	Tommy Andersson
25–28	16 March 2009	Örebro	Jessica Gunnarsson	Peter Ebkar	Lillemor Essén	Peter Lindberg
29–32	23 March 2009	Västerås	Katarina Feltendahl	Johan Benzeriane	Matti Koskinen	Annsofi Söderholm
33–36	30 March 2009	Uppsala	Johan Helander	Katrin Mandl	Therez Olsson	Örjan Swing
37–40	6 April 2009	Gothenburg	Dennis Bergsman	Madeleine Karlenfjälls	Anders Taube	Anna West

== Series 5: Autumn 2010 ==
Episodes	Premiered	Location	Contestants			
1–4	6 September 2010	Stockholm	Daniel	Irina	Lasse	Lillemor
5–8	13 September 2010	Malmö	Adjovi	Nils-Olof	Therese	Per
9–12	20 September 2010	Gothenburg	Jennifer	Jonatan	Staffan	Sofie
13–16	27 September 2010	Falkenberg	Mikaela	Lasse	Kerstin	Fredrik
17–20	4 October 2010	Stockholm Couples	Johan & Maria	Bo & Birgitta	Cecilia & Björn	Fredrik & Matthias
21–24	11 October 2010	Malmö	Isa	Ola	Christine	Fredrik
25–28	18 October 2010	Eskilstuna	Eric	Alexander	Inger	Madeleine
29–32	8 November 2010	Stockholm	Per	Lisa	Björn	Greta
33–36	15 November 2010	Borås	Jasna	Bengt	Christian	Pia
37–40	22 November 2010	Piteå	Crister	Siw	Jennie	Hans
41–44	29 November 2010	Stockholm	Nihan	Sonja	Efrem	Andreas
45–48	6 December 2010	Öland	Lotta	Michel	Staffan	Marika

== Series 6: Spring 2011 ==
Episodes	Premiered	Location	Contestants			
1–4	10 January 2011	Stockholm	Nic	Ellinor	Sandra	Johnny
5–8	17 January 2011	Västerås	Anna	Mikael	Örjan	Mika
9–12	24 January 2011	Östersund	Ingrid	Johan	Olle	Sara
13–16	31 January 2011	Stockholm	Monica	Linda	Rickard	Ulf
17–20	7 February 2011	?	??	??	??	??
21–24	14 February 2011	Stockholm	Karolina	Pehr	Mimmi	Marcus

== Series 7: Autumn 2011 ==
Episodes	Premiered	Location	Contestants			
1–4	29 Augusti 2011	Uppsala	Helena	Bruno	Susanne	Micke
5–8	5 September 2011	Stockholm	Torkel Knutsson	Louise Eriksson	Torbjörn Bernhardsson	Malena Enget

415,000 viewers watched the first episode of series 2, with 502,000 watching the final episode.

438,000 viewers watched the first episode of series 3, with 863,000 watching the final episode.

833,000 viewers watched the first episode of series 4, with 880,000 watching the episode shown on Wednesday 3 February 2010.

788, 000 viewers watched 5 October 2010 episode with a 24.8% share of all viewers. It was the most-watched non-news programme of the day.
