= Great Divide (Twin Atlantic album) =

Studio album by Twin Atlantic
- Released: 18 August 2014
- Genre: Rock
- Length: 42:44
- Label: Red Bull Records
- Producers: Gil Norton, Jacknife Lee

Twin Atlantic chronology
Free (2011)	Great Divide (2014)	GLA (2016)

Great Divide is the third studio album by Scottish alternative rock band Twin Atlantic.

On 31 March 2014 Zane Lowe premiered lead single "Heart and Soul" as the Hottest Record in the World on BBC Radio 1. It has peaked at No. 17 on the UK Singles Chart. On 24 August 2014, Great Divide became the band's highest charting album to date reaching No. 1 on the Scottish Album Charts and No. 6 on the UK charts.

== Reception ==
Professional ratings
Aggregate scores
Source	Rating
Metacritic	73/100
Review scores
Source	Rating
AllMusic	3/5 stars
Drowned in Sound	3/10 stars
Punktastic	Positive
The Guardian	4/5 stars
The Line of Best Fit	6.5/10

The album was included at number 23 on Kerrang!'s "The Top 50 Rock Albums Of 2014" list.

== Track listing ==
All songs are written and composed by Twin Atlantic.

No.	Title	Length
1.	"The Ones That I Love (Intro)"	3:02
2.	"Heart and Soul"	3:37
3.	"Hold On"	3:36
4.	"Fall Into The Party"	3:26
5.	"Brothers and Sisters"	3:42
6.	"Oceans"	3:57
7.	"I Am An Animal"	3:32
8.	"Be A Kid"	4:14
9.	"Cell Mate"	3:03
10.	"Rest In Pieces"	4:04
11.	"Actions That Echo"	3:18
12.	"Why Won't We Change?"	3:17
Total length:		42:44

Bonus Tracks
No.	Title	Length
13.	"Raise a Symphony"
14.	"Globalisolation"
15.	"It's Not Dead"
16.	"Heart & Soul (Acoustic)"

== Charts ==
Chart performance for Great Divide
Chart (2014)	Peak position
Irish Albums (IRMA)	77
Scottish Albums (Official Charts)	1
UK Albums (Official Charts)	6
UK Album Downloads (Official Charts)	9
UK Independent Albums (Official Charts)	2
UK Rock & Metal Albums (Official Charts)	1
