= Filmtecknarna =

FilmTecknarna is a Swedish animation studio formed by Jonas Odell, Lars Ohlson, Stig Bergkvist, and Martti Ekstrand in 1981.

== History ==
The studio started out producing their own independent films before moving into commercials and music videos. The studio has become known for an eclectic blend of animation and live action. FilmTecknarna today consists of three companies: FilmTecknarna Stockholm (focused on the production of TV-commercials and music videos), FilmTecknarna Inc. (based in New York City and focused on producing commercials, broadcast graphics, and music videos for the U.S. market), and finally, FilmTecknarna Fiction, that devotes itself to the development and production of long-format productions, such as TV-series, short films and feature films. The commercial division today represents thirteen directors working in a variety of styles and techniques. They are: Jonas Odell, Stig Bergqvist, Jonas Dahlbeck, Jessica Laurén, Johanna Andersson, Boris Nawratil, David Nord, Jory Hull, Lucas Zanotti, Jasmin Jodry, and a new director soon to be made public. The founders, Jonas Odell, Lars Ohlson, and Stig Bergqvist, were students in Stockholm who joined to make small super 8 films in the 1970s.

== List of films ==
- The Man Who Thought with His Hat (Swedish: Mannen som tänkte med hatten), 1984; based on the book by Gunnar Berefelt
- Dawning (Swedish: Dagen Bräcks), 1985, based on a short comic by Joakim Pirinen
- Pesce Pesce, 1988
- Exit, 1989
- Alice in Plasmaland, 1993
- Revolver (Swedish: Här är karusellen), 1993
- Body Parts, 1995
- Ebbe & Sten, 1995
- Otto, 1997
- Family & Friends (Swedish: Släkt & vänner), 2002
- Never Like the First Time! (Swedish: Aldrig som första gången!), 2006

FilmTecknarna also made Boddingtons ads in 1999.
