= Busk Margit Jonsson =

Swedish Soprano opera singer (1929–2026)

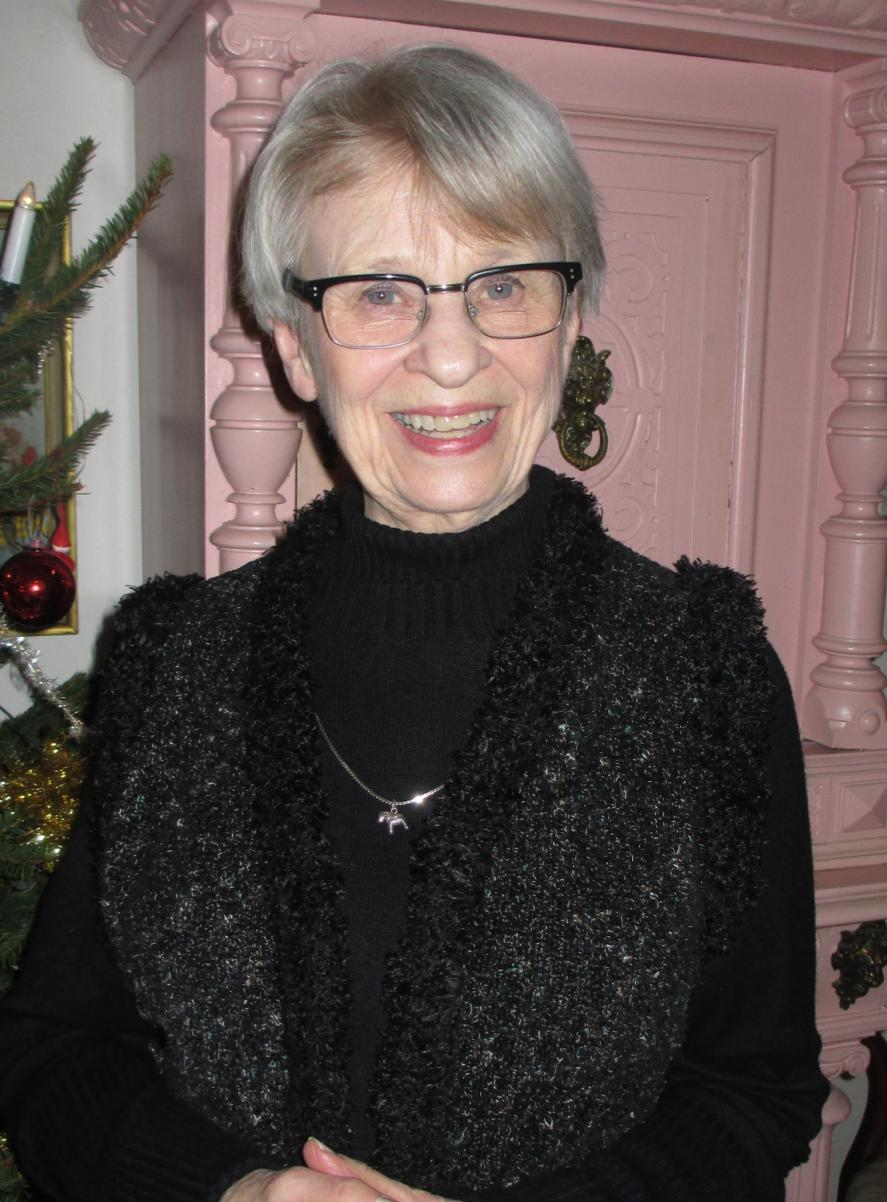
Jonsson in 2016

Busk Margit Jonsson (10 September 1929 – 24 April 2026) was a Swedish operatic soprano.

== Life and career ==
Jonsson was born in Malung, Dalarna County, on 10 September 1929. She appeared in many roles during her time at the Royal Swedish Opera from 1954 to 1983, and was awarded the prestigious "Jussi Björling scholarship" in 1975.

She was guest host on the popular radio programme Sommar.

From 1964 to 1977, she was married to Swedish actor Helge Skoog. She had been married to opera singer Ingvar Wixell before.

Her name follows traditional norms from Dalarna – Name of the family farm, personal name, patronymic.

Jonsson died on 24 April 2026, at the age of 96.

== Filmography ==
- 1964 – Svenska bilder
- 1960 – Carmen (TV)
- 1958 – Min syster och jag (TV)
- 1957 – Värmlänningarna
- 1953 – Bror min och jag
- 1951 – Talande tråden
