= Vivarium (album) =

Studio album by Twin Atlantic
- Released: 14 September 2009
- Recorded: 2009, Los Angeles
- Genre: Pop punk; alternative rock; post-hardcore
- Length: 33:05
- Label: Red Bull
- Producer: John Travis

Twin Atlantic chronology
A Guidance from Colour (2008)	Vivarium (2009)	Free (2011)

Singles from Vivarium
- 1. "Lightspeed" Released: 29 June 2009; 2. "You're Turning into John Wayne" Released: September 2009; 3. "What Is Light? Where Is Laughter?" Released: 30 November 2009; 4. "Human After All" Released: 2010

Professional ratings
Review scores
Source	Rating
Absolutepunk.net	86%
AllMusic	3.5/5 stars

Vivarium is the debut album by the Scottish alternative rock band Twin Atlantic.

Music videos for "What Is Light? Where Is Laughter?" and "Lightspeed" were filmed during their American tour and have since been uploaded through their MySpace and PureVolume pages.

== Track listing ==
All tracks are written by Twin Atlantic.

No.	Title	Length
1.	"Lightspeed"	3:21
2.	"Old Grey Face (And the Way of the Magenta)"	2:48
3.	"You're Turning into John Wayne"	4:17
4.	"Caribbean War Syndrome"	6:11
5.	"What Is Light? Where Is Laughter?"	3:38
6.	"Human After All"	4:19
7.	"Audience and Audio"	3:54
8.	"Better Weather"	4:23

iTunes bonus tracks
No.	Title	Length
9.	"A Guidance from Colour"	6:17
10.	"I Cave In"	3:13
11.	"Time Is the Enemy"	4:44

== Personnel ==
- Sam McTrusty – rhythm guitar, lead vocals
- Barry McKenna – lead guitar, cello, backing vocals
- Ross McNae – bass guitar, piano, backing vocals
- Craig Kneale – drums, percussion, backing vocals

== Charts ==
Chart performance for Vivarium
Chart (2025)	Peak position
UK Rock & Metal Albums (OCC)	32
