= Exit (1990 film) =

1990 Swedish animated film

- Directed by: Lars Ohlson; Jonas Odell; Martti Ekstrand; Stig Bergqvist
- Starring: Philip Zandén; Ernst Günther; Peter Harryson; Helge Skoog; Meta Velander; Lina Wester
- Music by: Jonas Odell; Martti Ekstrand; Jessica Laurén; Juhani Ekstrand
- Production company: Filmtecknarna
- Distributed by: Swedish Film Institute
- Release date: 16 November 1990 (Film Day)
- Running time: 21 minutes
- Country: Sweden
- Language: Swedish

Exit is a 1990 Swedish animated short film directed by Lars Ohlson, Jonas Odell, Martti Ekstrand, and Stig Bergqvist for Filmtecknarna, the studio they founded in 1981.

== Plot ==
The film is about four friends—Åke, Hilding, Harry, and Hilding's younger brother—who visit a hedonistic and sadistic amusement park. Three of them love it, but when Åke grows unhappy, he discovers that it is impossible to exit.

== Production ==
Exit was inspired by two elements: a nightmare Bergqvist had about an amusement park/department store, and a story told by writer Joakim Pirinen about a visit to East Berlin where he was obliged to convert his money into East German marks, but was barred from taking the marks out of the country, obliging him to spend them on "what there was to buy (i.e. cheap souvenirs and nylon socks)".

== Release ==
The film premiered at the Swedish Film Institute's Film Day festival on 16 November 1990 and was released in cinemas on 25 December of the same year, as part of the short film package "Exit and Other Exits". It also aired at the Ottawa International Animation Festival, where it won a prize for best story.

Exit was included on the DVD releases Life from the Dark Side: Animated Films for Fearless Adults (2004) and Everyone Speaks Swedish! (2007).

== Reception ==
Tom McSorley described Exit as "a mordant satire on how the entertainment industry exploits and deforms us". Writing for AWN.com, Chris Robinson described Exit as "one of the studio's first films to receive international acclaim, and arguably their best work to date". Robinson notes "the deceptively simple design, which is more aligned with classical animation (like Dawning and The Man Who Thought With His Hat) than with the more expressionist design of Revolver, Otto and Body Parts", adding "initially, one laments the lack of stylish graphic design until you understand the consciously alluring effect of the 'cartoony' nature of Exit."

== Cast ==
- Philip Zandén (voice) as Åke / Emaciated man / Warthog
- Ernst Günther (voice) as Panda
- Peter Harryson (voice) as Hilding / Hilding's brother
- Helge Skoog (voice) as Guard / Man on the cross
- Meta Velander (voice) as Prompter at theatre
- Lina Wester (voice) as Child in rabbit costume
