= A Guidance from Colour =

A Guidance From Colour

EP by Twin Atlantic
- Released: (United Kingdom) 14 January 2008
- Recorded: 2007
- Studio: Long Wave Studio, Cardiff
- Genre: Pop punk; alternative rock
- Length: 18:04
- Label: Staple Diet Records
- Producer: Romesh Dodangoda

Twin Atlantic chronology
A Guidance From Colour (2008)	Vivarium (2009)

A Guidance from Colour is the debut EP from the alternative rock band Twin Atlantic from Glasgow.

A four-song EP recorded in 2007, it was released as a CD and digital download on 14 January 2008.

The first single released from the EP was "Audience and Audio" on 24 December 2007.

== Track listing ==
All music is composed by Twin Atlantic.

No.	Title	Length
1.	"Audience and Audio"	3:54
2.	"I Cave In"	3:14
3.	"Time Is The Enemy"	4:44
4.	"A Guidance from Colour"	6:11
Total length:		18:04

== Personnel ==
- Sam McTrusty – Guitar and Lead Vocals
- Barry McKenna – Guitar, Cello and Backing Vocals
- Ross McNae – Bass Guitar, Piano and Backing Vocals
- Craig Kneale – Drums
