= Free (Twin Atlantic album) =

Studio album by Twin Atlantic
- Released: 29 April 2011
- Recorded: Red Bull Studios, Los Angeles
- Genres: Rock; alternative rock
- Length: 46:22
- Label: Red Bull Records
- Producer: Gil Norton

Twin Atlantic chronology
Vivarium (2009)	Free (2011)	Great Divide (2014)

Free is the second studio album by Scottish alternative rock band Twin Atlantic. It was released on 29 April 2011 in Ireland and 2 May 2011 in the UK on Red Bull Records.

In its first week of release, the album peaked at #37 in the Official UK Album Chart. This success led to them being part of the T In The Park 2011 line-up.

The track Free debuted at No. 14 on the NME Chart.

Professional ratings
Aggregate scores
Source	Rating
Metacritic	55/100
Review scores
Source	Rating
The Herald	Favourable
Punktastic	5/5 stars
Rock Sound	9/10 stars
Louder	—

== Track listing ==
All songs are written and composed by Twin Atlantic.

No.	Title	Length
1.	"Edit Me"	2:53
2.	"Time For You To Stand Up"	3:02
3.	"Apocalyptic Renegade"	3:13
4.	"Yes, I Was Drunk"	4:26
5.	"Dreamember"	3:28
6.	"Free"	3:27
7.	"Crash Land"	3:57
8.	"Make a Beast of Myself"	3:27
9.	"The Ghost of Eddie"	3:16
10.	"Serious Underground Dance Vibes"	3:52
11.	"Eight Days"	3:29
12.	"Wonder Sleeps Here"	4:00
13.	"We Want Better, Man"	3:58
Total length:		46:22

== Singles ==
The first single to be released from Free was Edit Me, on 14 February 2011. The first release of the single Free soon followed on 24 April 2011, preceding the release of Time For You To Stand Up on 11 July 2011. Make A Beast Of Myself was the fourth single from the album with a release date of 26 September 2011.

Both Free and Make A Beast Of Myself were re-released, on 19 December 2011 and 23 April 2012 respectively. Free peaked at number 99 in the Official UK Singles Chart.

Yes, I Was Drunk, the fifth song to be released from the album, was released on 27 August 2012.

Year	Single	Peak chart positions		
Year	Single	UK	US Alt.	CAN Rock
2011	"Edit Me"	—	—	—
2011	"Free"	—	—	—
2011	"Time For You To Stand Up"	—	—	—
2011	"Make A Beast Of Myself"	—	—	—
2011	"Free" (re-release)	99	29	33
2012	"Make A Beast Of Myself" (re-release)	—	—	—
2012	"Yes, I Was Drunk"	—	—	—
"—" denotes a title that did not chart

== Accolades ==
Publication	Accolade	Recording	Year	Rank
Dead Press	Top 10 Albums Of 2011	-	2011	5th
Rock Sound	Albums Of The Year	-	2011	9th
Kerrang!	Best 50 Albums Of 2011	-	2011	20th
Total Guitar	Best Guitar Albums Of The Year	-	2011	11th

(*) designates unordered lists.

== Personnel ==
- Sam McTrusty - rhythm guitar, lead vocals
- Barry McKenna - lead guitar, cello, backing vocals
- Ross McNae - bass guitar, piano, backing vocals
- Craig Kneale - drums, percussion, backing vocals

== Charts and certifications ==
Charts

Chart performance for Free
Chart (2012)	Peak position
Scottish Albums (Official Charts)	11
UK Albums (Official Charts)	37
UK Independent Albums (Official Charts)	7
UK Rock & Metal Albums (Official Charts)	3

Certifications

Certifications for Free
Region	Certification	Certified units/sales
United Kingdom (BPI)	Gold	100,000^{‡}
^{‡} Sales+streaming figures based on certification alone.
