= Drive-By Argument =

UK musical group

- Also known as: DBA, Drive-By
- Origin: Strathaven, Great Britain
- Genres: Indie rock, indie pop, alternative dance, indietronica, electro, techno
- Years active: 2004–2009
- Labels: One (2005), Lizard King (2006–2009)
- Members: Stoke; Stu Ken; Ryan Drever; Colin Keenan; Lewis Gardener

Drive-By Argument was an indietronica band from Ayr, Scotland. The quintet released their self-titled début album Drive-By Argument on 19 May 2008.

== History ==
=== Early years (2004–2005) ===
The band originally formed as part of a music project for a university course in 2004. Before the formation of the band, the members had never met, except for bassist Ryan 'Clown' Drever and frontman Stoke, who lived together. The band then made the irrational decision to drop out of university and commit to their short-lived new project, Drive-By Argument.

The band released two show-only EPs during the course of 2005, called EP1 and December Demos/Dragon EP.

=== One Records/Sex Lines Are Expensive Comedy (2005–2006) ===
In late 2005, the band signed a one single deal with Glasgow label One Records, releasing their very first limited-edition single "Sex Lines Are Expensive Comedy" on 24 October 2005. The song gained the band a small following, and was used regularly at Madison Square Garden on the warm-up soundtrack for the National Hockey League's New York Rangers. It was also used once on the American crime drama Cold Case.

=== Lizard King Records (2006) ===
In 2006, the band signed to indie label Lizard King Records. The band received attention when they secured a supporting position for two dates of Panic! at the Disco's 2006 UK tour. The first date was at the Wolverhampton Civic Hall (22 August 2006) and the second was at Brixton Academy (22 October 2006).

=== Album and split (2006–2009) ===
In late 2006, after a bout of touring, the band went into the studio and recorded their self-titled debut studio album, Drive-By Argument, which was originally designated for release in September 2007. After several delays in the release of the album, it was finally released the following year via download on 12 May 2008. On 5 March 2007, the band released a limited-edition vinyl/download single called "The Sega Method". Shortly before that, the band began their first major solo tour to promote the new single and forthcoming album. In the summer, the band released a re-recorded version of "Sex Lines Are Expensive Comedy" for their second album single release on 25 June 2007.

The band released their third album single "Dance Like No-One's Watching" on 28 April 2008. So far, it has been the most well-received single from Drive-By Argument, securing a place on the MTV2 MySpace Chart for several weeks during April and May 2008.

They released their album on 19 March 2008. The band announced that they were splitting up on 23 February 2009 through a blog post on their MySpace profile. All five members, however, had gone on to form a new band called Atlas Skye, taking more of a pop rock approach.

After the split of Atlas Skye, each member of the band joined or formed local acts in Glasgow. Currently these bands are Midnight Lion (Lewis and Stoke), No Island (Ryan and Stuart) and The Mouse That Ate The Cat (Colins project with Brian from The Dykeenies.

In 2013, Stoke (real name Stewart Brock) and drummer, Lewis, formed Prides. The band has had relative success, performing at the Commonwealth games.

== Discography ==
=== Albums ===
- Drive-By Argument (2008, Lizard King Records)

=== EPs ===
- EP1 (2005)
- December Demos/Dragon (2005)
- Beta (2007)

=== Singles ===
- "Sex Lines Are Expensive Comedy" (2005, One Records)
- "The Sega Method" (2007, Lizard King Records)
- "Sex Lines Are Expensive Comedy" (Re-release) (2007, One Records)
- "Dance Like No-One's Watching" (2008)
