= Tax investigation =

In-depth investigation to recover evaded taxes

A tax investigation is an in-depth investigation processed by a tax authority in order to recover tax undercharged in previous years of assessment. This is the general term in Commonwealth countries. It is carried out when a taxpayer is suspected of tax evasion, or just by random sampling.

== See also ==
- Income tax audit
- Tax collection
- Tax administration
