= Al-Zein crime family =

Criminal organization founded in Germany

Al-Zein Clan
- Founding location: Germany
- Years active: 2000s–present
- Territory: Europe, Middle East, United States
- Ethnicity: Mhallami
- Membership (est.): 15,000 members
- Criminal activities: Drug trafficking, armed robbery, Arms trafficking, Assault, extortion, fraud, money laundering, kidnapping, murder
- Allies: Miri-Clan

The Al-Zein crime family (Arabic: الزين, romanized: az-Zayn; also known as the Al-Zein Clan) is a prominent Mhallami mafia organization primarily based in Germany. This criminal syndicate has gained notoriety for its wide-ranging involvement in various illicit activities, including drug trafficking, armed robbery, arms trafficking, assault, extortion, fraud, money laundering, kidnapping, and murder.

The al-Zein Clan has garnered significant attention due to its vast membership, estimated to be around 15,000 individuals primarily located in Germany. While its core operations are based in Germany, the clan has extended its influence and presence throughout Europe and the Middle East, with members reported in countries such as Sweden, Denmark, the Netherlands, Turkey and the United States. While most are based in Germany, the clan has members throughout Europe and the Middle East, for example in Sweden, Denmark, the Netherlands and Turkey.

The State Criminal Police Office of North Rhine-Westphalia attributed 231 suspects in North Rhine-Westphalia to the Al-Zein clan in 2022, who were allegedly responsible for 431 offences. In the same year, a double-digit number of clan members were in prison. The clan is regarded as the second-largest criminal clan in North Rhine-Westphalia.

== Origins ==
The family is attributed to the Arab-Assyrian ethnic group of the Mhallami, who originally come from the Syrian-Turkish border region. Following the collapse of the Ottoman Empire, large parts of the Al-Zein family migrated to Lebanon for economic reasons and due to discrimination, particularly in the 1930s. There, they adopted the Arabic name Al-Zein.

In the 1980s, a large part of the family then migrated via Lebanon and the German Democratic Republic to West Berlin.

== Clan members and media attention ==
=== Mahmoud Al-Zein ===
Mahmoud (Mohaiddine) Al-Zein is regarded as the head of the clan in Germany (as of January 2021). He is also known as the "Godfather of Berlin" or "El Presidente". According to police investigations, he is in reality a Turkish national named Mahmut Uca from the south Anatolian province of Mardin. He entered West Berlin in 1982 with his family as a tourist holding a Lebanese passport. After his asylum application was rejected in 1984 and the decision became final in 1986, he could no longer be deported from Germany as a stateless person, since his nationality could not be unequivocally established due to the absence of identifying documents. Mahmoud Al-Zein had already been convicted in 1998 for drug trafficking, bodily harm, and robbery, and was convicted again as a drug dealer in 2003. Media reports at that time already described him as a clan leader. In 2002, Turkey confirmed that Mahmoud Al-Zein was registered there as Mahmut Uca; his Turkish citizenship had been revoked for failing to complete military service. In 2003, Mahmoud Al-Zein became a topic of discussion between the then Turkish Interior Minister Abdülkadir Aksu and the then German Interior Minister Otto Schily, as the Turkish side refused to accept his transfer to Turkey. Mahmoud Al-Zein was convicted again in 2005 for drug trafficking and sentenced to four years and three months in prison. Between 2005 and 2021, Mahmoud was recorded as a suspect nearly 70 times and convicted eleven times. According to Spiegel TV, he received 3,200 euros monthly in "unemployment benefits, child benefits", and similar payments for himself, his wife, and nine children.

On 29 January 2021, the Berlin Senate Department of the Interior confirmed that Mahmoud Al-Zein had left the country. He flew that same day from Berlin Brandenburg Airport with several family members to Istanbul to avoid possible deportation. An entry ban was initially imposed on him for six months. He had already regained Turkish citizenship in 2020. In 2020, he had also applied again for asylum in Berlin on family and health grounds. The immigration authority extended his entry and residence ban to seven years. Al-Zein filed a lawsuit against the entry and residence ban. In December 2024, the administrative court urged the immigration authority to reach a settlement, as the court considered the seven-year entry ban disproportionate. In the settlement, the entry ban was reduced from seven to four and a half years, ending on 29 July 2025. He could then apply for a visa. After the hearing, his nephew Fadie Al-Zein, previously convicted of dangerous bodily harm, threats, and drug offences, punched Spiegel TV reporter Thomas Heise. Heise filed a complaint. A special commission for organised crime is investigating the assault.

=== Murder of Iptehal Al-Zain ===
On 1 September 2008, the then 20-year-old Iptehal Al-Zain was found dead at a motorway service area. In January 2010, the Hagen Disctrict Court sentenced her then 20-year-old cousin Ezzedin Al-Zain to 14 years' imprisonment for involvement in murder for base motives. The victim's uncle, also involved in the murder, initially evaded prosecution by leaving the country. According to the court's judgment, a family council decided on the murder (a so-called honour killing), as it did not accept the woman's lifestyle, since she lived in a women's shelter. In September 2012, the suspected uncle Hussain Al-Zein was arrested in Finland; after extradition to Germany, he was found guilty of joint murder on 15 July 2013 and sentenced to life imprisonment. Iptehal's brother Hüsein Al-Zein was sentenced in the same proceedings for aiding murder to a youth sentence of six and a half years.

=== Family Union ===
In February 2011, family member Zadine El-Zein, together with a member of the Miri clan, presented a Family Union in an interview with Der Tagesspiegel that reportedly reached an estimated 70% of the members of both families. The Family Union's aim was primarily to convince younger family members that education offered better prospects than a criminal career. The Family Union planned to open its own leisure facilities in the Berlin districts of Neukölln, Wedding, and Spandau. At the same time, the Union emphasised in the interview its willingness to cooperate with the police. Its members also include relatives of other large Arab families, including the Remmo clan.

At the end of 2018, the city of Essen ended cooperation with the association "due to unfulfilled hopes". The Arbeiterwohlfahrt also terminated its partnership in the youth sector "due to incompatibility of objectives". In 2019, members of the Family Union received a warning address from Essen police after Berlin migration researcher Ralph Ghadban was threatened by members of various clans following the publication of his book Arabische Clans – die unterschätzte Gefahr (Arab clans – the underestimated danger). In May 2019, the chairman of the Family Union resigned.

=== Mahmoud Charr ===
In the night of 2 September 2015, Mahmoud Charr was shot and seriously injured in a döner kebab shop in Essen. On 14 September, Youssef Hassan, born Al-Zein, who had been wanted via a public appeal, turned himself in to police with a confession. He was sentenced to five years' imprisonment for dangerous bodily harm.

=== KaDeWe robbery ===
On 20 December 2014, five people, including Khalil Al-Zein, Jehad Al-Zein, Hamza Al-Zein, and Hussein Miri, robbed the Kaufhaus des Westens (KaDeWe). They caused considerable property damage with bludgeoning weapons and committed bodily harm by spraying irritant gas, which caused respiratory problems for customers present. Their haul was jewellery worth €817,260. Following a public manhunt, three of the five perpetrators were arrested and convicted. In May 2016, Jehad Al-Zein was sentenced to 6 years and 8 months' imprisonment, and Hamza Al-Zein in October of the same year to two years and nine months' youth detention.

=== 2016 raid ===
On 12 April 2016, 16 flats, premises, and businesses belonging to the family in the Berlin districts of Lankwitz, Hermsdorf, and Gropiusstadt were searched during a raid. The operation involved 200 police officers, including 60 from the SEK. Eight arrest warrants were executed, and a Porsche, jewellery, cash, and a live firearm were seized.

=== Murder commission by Zaki Al-Zein ===
In December 2017, Zaki Al-Zein was sentenced to six years and eleven months' imprisonment for attempted incitement of murder and aiding the KaDeWe robbery, in which his sons Jehad Al-Zein and Hamza Al-Zein were involved.

=== Parallel justice ===
In a 2018 RBB report on criminal Arab clans, Jamal El-Zein confirmed the existence of parallel justice, including judgments already passed in cases of homicide.

=== 2021 raid and convictions ===
In a major raid involving around 600 officers against the Al-Zein clan on 8 June 2021, arrest warrants were executed against four people, and 31 properties in Leverkusen, Duisburg, and Düsseldorf were searched. "Large quantities of cash" (including 343,000 euros in one property alone), several firearms, other assets such as Rolex watches, and a mansion were seized. The family had purchased the mansion in Leverkusen in 2018 for 650,000 euros, paying it off in instalments with money from the job centre (a total of 12 family members received social benefits from the job centre). In June 2022, a trial began in Düsseldorf against seven members of the Al-Zein clan for hostage-taking, organised social service fraud, and other offences. The defendants were also accused, in varying degrees of involvement, of robbery, tax evasion, serious bodily harm, money laundering, extortion, and forced labour. All seven defendants remained silent in proceedings on the charges, and their defence counsel stated at the start of the trial that this would not change. The family had submitted 26 applications for social benefits for various communities in need to the job centre in Leverkusen, despite no entitlement existing, and allegedly received 456,000 euros in social benefits between 2014 and 2021. In the proceedings, the public prosecutor applied for confiscation of the mansion and other assets.

Badia Al-Zein, the family patriarch of the family residing in the Leverkusen mansion, has lived in Germany since 1990 and received benefits from the job centre at least until his arrest in 2021, yet drove a Mercedes-Benz S-Class registered in the name of another family member. Proceedings against him for robbery and extortion were discontinued in 2006. Badia Al-Zein had been monitored by law enforcement for years. In the 2022 trial, he was sentenced to six years' imprisonment for hostage-taking, dangerous bodily harm, and social benefit fraud. Two of his eight sons were sentenced to three years' imprisonment in the same year, while his wife and another child were discharged.

In December 2025, the Federal Court of Justice dismissed the appeal against a Düsseldorf Regional Court judgment ordering the confiscation of the 300-square-metre mansion belonging to the son of the Al-Zein clan leader. He had been convicted of money laundering, and confiscation of the mansionn was ordered as it had been financed through criminal activities. Nine clan members lived in the mansion and simultaneously received state benefits such as housing allowance. The responsible job centre paid the nine-person family around 5,200 euros per month. When police stormed the location in June 2021, they found a six-figure sum of cash and luxury watches worth 160,000 euros, which were seized. The search received nationwide media coverage in 2021.

=== 2022 raid ===
On 14 December 2022, searches of 55 properties took place in more than 20 cities by police and tax investigators, including in Berlin, Cologne, Münster, Dortmund, Bochum, Solingen, and Gelsenkirchen, as well as in Lower Saxony and Hesse. More than 300 officers were deployed, and several arrest warrants against clan members were executed. North Rhine-Westphalian Interior Minister Herbert Reul stated that the operation was concerned with "stolen goods, fraud, and extortion on a large scale".

=== 2025 attempted murder at children's birthday party ===
On 14 July 2025, a man entered a backyard in Essen where a children's birthday party was taking place. When he spotted the father of the birthday child behind a window in the building, he drew a pistol and fired seven targeted shots at the 37-year-old with links to the clan milieu in front of the guests. All bullets missed the target. Police have since been searching for the 57-year-old Samir Al-Zein, a leading figure in the Al-Zein clan.

== Sweden ==
The clan has branches in Malmö, Hässleholm, Landskrona, Lomma, and Perstorp.

According to the police authorities' so-called clan report, it is one of the three most prominent family-based criminal networks in Malmö. A total of 15 men are selected from families with slightly varying surnames but still part of the same Al Zein / El Zein clan. Several live in southern Malmö and the southern city centre, where they are suspected of exerting significant influence on the local community. Some families are or were involved in various motorcycle gangs: Outlaws, La Familia, and more recently Satudarah. Several have been convicted of offences including serious drug crimes, organised forgery, and attempted extortion. According to the police clan report, the family-based criminal network El-Zein has family ties to the Fakhro clan in Malmö.

== Documentaries ==
- Die Clans – Arabische Großfamilien in Deutschland (The Clans – Arab extended families in Germany). Television report, Germany, 2018, 27:55 min., written and directed by Olaf Sundermeyer, presented by Astrid Frohloff, production: RBB, series: Kontraste, first broadcast: 2 August 2018 on RBB Fernsehen
- Arabische Clans in Berlin (Arab clans in Berlin). Documentary film, Germany, 2016, 53:20 min., written and directed by Thomas Heise and Claas Meyer-Heuer, presented by Maria GreszMaria Gresz, production: Spiegel TV, series: Magazin, online publication: 11 December 2016
- DER SPIEGEL (2025-01-15). Angriff auf Reporter: Clan-Mitglied Fadie Al-Zein schlägt zu [Attack on reporter: Clan member Fadie Al-Zein strikes] (in German). SPIEGEL TV – via YouTube.
