= Association of Independent Music =

British non-profit trade body

- Abbreviation: AIM
- Formation: 1999
- Purpose: Supporting the UK's independent music companies
- Headquarters: Chiswick, London
- Coordinates: 51.486477°N 0.250788°W
- Members: 800
- Key people: Gee Davy, CEO
- Staff: 9
- Website: aim.org.uk

The Association of Independent Music (AIM) is a non-profit trade body established in 1999 by UK independent record labels to represent the independent record sector, which in 2016 constituted approximately 23% of the UK market. Its members include record labels, self-releasing artists and distributors.

It runs Indie-Con, an annual conference for the independent music industry.

== History ==
Alison Wenham founded AIM in 1999, and spent 17 years as its chair and CEO.

In 2004, AIM featured in the press over their contract negotiations with Apple for rights to distribute their labels' content on the iTunes service. AIM was ultimately successful in negotiating equivalent terms for its independent labels members that Apple had originally only offered to the 'major' labels.

In September 2008, AIM became a founding member of UK Music, which represents all aspects of the UK music industry.

In November 2016 AIM appointed Paul Pacifico as CEO.

The 2016 WINTEL report showed that the indie sector constituted about 23% of total market share.

On 24 September 2018, Pacifico co-represented IMPALA, the body representing European indie record labels, at the expert workshop organised by the Centre for Fine Arts in Brussels (BOZAR), the European Cultural Foundation and the British Council about Brexit and the cultural sector. The goal was "to reaffirm our shared intent and common values, and to produce practical recommendations from the cultural and creative sectors that go beyond those that have already been made", and a list of recommendations was afterwards published on the IMPALA website.

Pacifico stepped down in December 2022, having served two three-year terms. He was succeeded by Sylvia Montello, who stayed in role just 15 months before resigning in April 2024. COO Gee Davy was named Interim CEO, before being formally appointed to the role in November 2024 at the organisations AGM. Since November 2023 the organisation has been Chaired by Ruth Barlow, Director of Live Licensing at Beggars Group.

== AIM Awards ==
The AIM Independent Music Awards are hosted by the Association of Independent Music (AIM) and were established in 2011 to recognize artists signed to independent record labels in the United Kingdom. Award categories include:

- Best Small Label
- Best 'Difficult' 2nd Album
- Special Catalogue Release of the Year
- Hardest Working Band or Artist
- Golden Welly Award for Best Independent Festival
- Independent Breakthrough of the Year
- Indie Champion Award
- Independent Video of the Year
- Best Live Act
- Independent Track of the Year
- Independent Album of the Year
- Independent Label of the Year
- PPL Awards for Most Played New independent Act
- Innovator Award
- Pioneer Award
- Outstanding Contribution to Music Award

The 2018 awards were held in partnership with Young Urban Arts Foundation and saw bands and labels like IDLES, Let's Eat Grandma and Partisan Records nominated.

== Indie-Con ==
The inaugural music industry conference, the AIM Indie-Con took place in 2012 in the Glaziers Hall London, returning there each year until at least 2018. The inaugural music industry conference, Indie-Con took place in 2012 in the Glaziers Hall London, returning there each year until at least 2018.

== Aim Connected ==
The Association of Independent Music launched a new networking event in 2019, called Aim Connected. Spread over three days in March, the event strives to connect business, tech and people. The event includes industry expert panels, workshops and one-on-one networking sessions. Aim Connected's 2019 speakers included executive producer of 'Surviving R. Kelly' dream Hampton, London's Night Czar Amy Lame, Hospital Records founder Chris Goss, and VICE creative director, Emil Asmussen.

=== Unrelated Australian version ===
From 2017, a separate event known as Indie-Con Australia has been run in Adelaide, under the auspices of the Australian Independent Record Labels Association (AIR), with support from the South Australian government.

== Significant labels under AIM ==
- Beggars Group
- Domino Records
- Grand Central
- Independiente
- 4AD Records
- Ninja Tune
- XL Recordings
- Warp
- Lucky Me
- Young
- Bella Union Records
- Transgressive Records
- Heavy Metal Records
- Revolver Music
- Because Music

== Significant artists under AIM labels ==
- Adele
- Arctic Monkeys
- Brightblack Morning Light
- Basement Jaxx
- Billy Bragg
- Cocteau Twins
- Coldcut
- Cornershop
- Dizzee Rascal
- Dogs Die in Hot Cars
- Echo & the Bunnymen
- Elbow
- Fingathing
- Frank Turner
- Franz Ferdinand
- Grandaddy
- Kate Rogers
- Laika
- Liberty X
- London Elektricity
- Maxïmo Park
- Mr. Scruff
- Paul Weller
- Rae & Christian
- Richard Thompson
- Roots Manuva
- Seafood
- Stereophonics
- The Church
- The Orb
- The Prodigy
- The White Stripes
- Tindersticks
- Underworld
