= Miri-Clan =

Kurdish-Mhallami crime family in Germany

Miri clan
- Founded: 1980s
- Founding location: Bremen, Germany
- Years active: 1980s–present
- Territory: Primarily Lower Saxony, as well as Berlin, Bremen and North Rhine-Westphalia
- Ethnicity: Mhallami
- Membership: 8-10.000
- Leaders: Ibrahim Miri, Heisem Miri
- Activities: Drug trafficking, armed robbery, arms trafficking, assault, extortion, fraud, money laundering, murder, kidnapping, prostitution
- Allies: Al-Zein clan Hells Angels MC
- Rivals: Bandidos MC; Mongols MC

The Miri clan or Miri crime family is an organized crime cartel in Germany. The Miri clan is mostly active in Bremen, partly also in Essen and Berlin. The organization is active in protection rackets, arms-, drug- and illegal medicine trafficking, as well as trafficking and exploiting people for prostitution. In Bremen, around 30 families with 3,500 members are assigned to the Miri clan, and over 8,000 - 10,000 nationwide.

The members of the Mardelli family-group arrived in Germany in the 1980s as refugees from Syria, Turkey and Lebanon. The Miri clan is less about directly related people than about members and descendants of a specific ethnic group, the Mhallami who are originally from Mardin. The Clan is also in Turkey and Sweden.

The Miri Family intermarry with other clan members to keep the power balance of the Family, according to Ralph Ghadban.

== As a criminal organization ==
Some of the members of the Miri family act as an organized crime group, with crimes including threats, drug and weapons trafficking. Money is laundered through real estate transactions and protection rackets. The Miri Clan engages in several legal ventures to maintain a legal appearance.

They are active in Lower Saxony. It is estimated that, in the city of Bremen alone, the group makes approximately €50 million each year from drug-related crime.

The families are particularly active in Hannover, Hildesheim, Stade, Achim, Wilhelmshaven, Peine, Göttingen, Osnabrück, Braunschweig, Salzgitter, Hameln, Lüneburg, Bremen and Delmenhorst.

In July 2019, a Bandidos hairdresser was shot in Dortmund by a member of the Miri family. The shooter has not yet been found. Also in 2019, the rapper 18 Karat from the environment of the Miri Family was arrested after a shooting, but was released because he had an alibi. Previously, four brothers of the Miri Family had also been arrested by the police in Bochum.

In 2024, a 34-year-old Miri clan member murdered a man of the rival Al-Zein crime family on a public street in Stade, close to Hamburg. He ran with a knife to the victim and rammed the knife in his head. After the attack. the Miris withdrew their business structures from downtown Stade and closed a number of businesses. The murderer was later captured by police in Buchholz.

=== Structure ===
Ibrahim Miri was boss of the gang for decades. On 10 July 2019, GSG 9 police officers arrested and escorted him, flew him to Berlin in a Federal Police helicopter and deported him to Oran, Algeria. Shortly afterwards, Ibrahim Miri re-entered Germany with the help of smugglers and was deported again on the night of November 23rd, 2019.

Ahmad Miri is considered one of the leading figures. In 2017, he offered a bounty for information about the whereabouts of an unknown person who had called him and the Berlin rapper Bushido “sons of bitches”. Ahmad Miri served several years in prison for drug trafficking.

Leaders of the Miri clan communicated using encrypted EncroChat communications. When French investigators decrypted the communications in 2020, several members of the Miri gang were accused of crimes and some were convicted.

=== Drug trafficking ===
The Miri Clan controls large parts of the drug trade, especially the cocaine trade, in Bremen.

In 2021, the police raided the clan, focusing on Dortmund. The head of the Miri drug trade, Esmat E., had previously fled to Spain because he was being searched for with an international arrest warrant. He was later discovered in Turkey. The Miri gang is said to have operated temporary storage facilities for cocaine in Dortmund and Werl. They are said to have manufactured the drugs themselves and resold them as allegedly Peruvian and therefore more expensive cocaine.

=== Human trafficking and prostitution ===
The Miri gang plays an important role in prostitution in Dortmund and Bremen. Leading gang members act as pimps and move women between different prostitution locations. The clan is involved in the illegal trafficking of women and girls who are forced into prostitution. This form of human trafficking is one of the most violent forms of deprivation of liberty.

=== Real estate, money laundering and protection racket ===
The Miri criminal gang uses real estate and legal businesses to launder money mainly in the cities of Dortmund and Bremen. The Miri gang collects protection money from restaurateurs in Bremen. The gang members dominate the scene of shops, kiosks and clubs, especially in the entertainment district Viertel and the railstation area (Hauptbahnhof and Remberti Viertel).

The Miri gang had managed to infiltrate an informant in the anti-money laundering authority of the Federal Ministry of Finance, which is subordinate to customs. The Financial Intelligence Unit (FIU) collects and analyzes suspicious activity reports in accordance with the Money Laundering Act. Employee Alexandros P. had passed on confidential information from the unit to the gang for months. He also used his access rights to government databases to query the central register of foreigners. The Bremen police discovered the man because his name came up in a wiretapped phone call from a gang member.

=== Turkey and Lebanon as a safe haven for criminals of Miri Clan ===
On 30 January 2009, Hussein Al Zein was shot and his fiancée was seriously injured. Heisem Miri (the perpetrator) is now on the run and is suspected to be in the Middle East.

On 10 July 2019, GSG 9 police officers arrested and escorted 46-year-old Ibrahim Miri from his apartment in Bremen, flew him to Berlin in a Federal Police helicopter and deported him to Beirut, Lebanon.

=== Relationship with state institutions ===
A large proportion of the Miri gang members receive transfer payments from the state (citizen's benefit, III or social benefit according to SGB XII or according to the Asylum Act). This means that criminal family members are considered unemployed and at the same time earn money through criminal activities. In some job centers, family members are banned from the premises because they have physically attacked employees.
