= El Presidente (band) =

Scottish pop rock band

- Origin: Glasgow, Scotland
- Genres: Glam rock, pop rock
- Years active: 2002–2007
- Labels: One Records, Sony BMG
- Members: Dante Gizzi; Laura Marks; Dawn Zhu; Johnny McGlynn; Thomas McNeice
- Past members: Ross Galloway (Roscoe P. Coltrane); Liam Nugent (Das Bold)

El Presidente (also written El Pres!dente) was a pop rock band from Glasgow, Scotland. Formed in 2002 by Gun member Dante Gizzi, the band gained major exposure with slots at T in the Park 2005, V Festival 2005 and again at T in the Park in 2006. The band have also supported Oasis, Duran Duran, Simple Minds and Kasabian on major tours of the UK.

== History ==
Whilst touring in France with Gun, Gizzi came up with the name El Presidente and after Gun split, began working on his own songs. In 2002 he made a few demos, along with brother Jools, on a small sampler and Billy Sloan aired them on his Sunday night Radio Clyde show.

After a couple of gigs at King Tuts in Glasgow as a solo artist with studio recorded backing tracks, Gizzi got a band together. The original line-up included brother Jools (previously also with Gun) on guitar and current drummer Dawn Zhu on drums. On signing up with One Records a subsidiary of GR management in Glasgow (also the Gun management team) a couple of the original members decided they did not want to tour with the band. Gizzi then recruited Laura Marks, Thomas McNeice and Johnny McGlynn. Shortly after the band signed a deal with Sony BMG.

The band's first release was a limited edition (1000 copies), red 10" vinyl released on 31 January 2005 which was promoted by the band's first video, which was produced by Jonas Odell and cost over £25,000. On 17 January they embarked on their first UK tour, supported by Stagger Lee. In February they shot their next video for the single "100 MPH". The accompanying video featured the band playing the song in different size boxes, reminiscent of a giant Rubik's Cube.

In April they supported Kasabian on another UK tour, then Oasis in May, on their only Scottish date. "100 MPH" was released on 2 May on a two-track CD, a DVD single and limited yellow vinyl. It reached #37 in the UK Singles Chart. To promote it, the band made their début on the BBC Television music programme Top of the Pops; plus on GMTV and CD:UK. In June, the band played two back to back sell out nights at King Tuts, and on 24 June 2005, were meant to play at the Glastonbury Festival, but their stage flooded and the band's set was cancelled.

On 25 July 2005, the band released "Without You". To promote it, they performed on GMTV, Top Of The Pops and TRL (on MTV). They did a session on BBC Radio 2 (in which they performed "Without You" and a cover of Prince's "Raspberry Beret"). There was a number of articles in The Sun and other national newspapers and the song was playlisted on BBC Radio 1, BBC Radio 2 and Xfm. The single reached number 30 in the UK chart. In July and August 2005 the band played some festivals, and a sell-out gig at The Liquid Rooms in Edinburgh. In September their next single was announced, which was to be a re-release of "Rocket". The video was an edited down version of the older video, but the single was re-recorded with the current line-up. They appeared on TRL again, but only for an interview, and they did numerous radio sessions on XFM and BBC Radio 2, The video was also playlisted on MTV Hits and Brand Spanking New. The single reached number 48.

On 24 October 2005, the band's début album was released with nine drum tracks recorded by original GUN drummer Alan Thornton and backing vocals on Turn This Thing Around. It reached number 57 in the UK Albums Chart. The band embarked on a full UK tour in September and October, and in early September supported Jamiroquai. In November they also took part in the charity recording of "Ever Fallen in Love (With Someone You Shouldn't've)" (originally by the Buzzcocks) as a tribute to the late John Peel. On 17 December the band played a Christmas show at the Barrowlands. Then on New Year's Eve 2005, they played at the annual Hogmanay celebration in the Royal Gardens in Scotland.

On 6 February 2006 the band released their fourth and final single from their début album, which was a re-recorded version of "Turn This Thing Around". The video to the song was shot in November in Japan. The story line to video was the lead singer, Gizzi had lost his memory, and must find the band on time to get to the show. The single did better than "Rocket", and went to number 39.

In July 2006 they performed at T In The Park on the main stage. They premièred one new song "Late Night Binges". On 21 July 2006, the band attended the Northsound 1 Awards, nominated for Best Live Act.

On their French November 2006 tour, another new song, "Reach Out" was played. Recording on their second album started in October. Johnny McElhone (Texas' bassist) also worked with the band on their second album, although just what his contribution will be is yet to be announced.

They played RockNess on 9 June 2007 and Saturday of the 2007 Glastonbury Festival.

Prior to the band's tour of France in November 2006, it was reported on the band's MySpace page by Marks that 'some recording was finished' in Glasgow. A further internet blog from the band came in January 2007 stating that recording was ongoing, and a new single and album would follow in the summer of 2007. No new information followed, and, due to Marks' current TV presenting role and Gizzi's work with Gun in 2008, it is uncertain where the band's future lies. The band's website, has since been re-directed to an unregistered domain and it is unknown whether the website itself still exists.

== Discography ==
=== Studio albums ===
- El Presidente (24 October 2005); #57 (UK); #10 (Jpn); #59 (Fra); Worldwide Sales: estimated 10,000
- El Presidente (8 February 2006); #1 (Jpn); Japanese Sales: estimated 10,000

=== Singles ===
Information
"Rocket"
- Released: 31 January 2005
- Chart positions: #84 (UK)
"100 MPH"
- Released: 2 May 2005
- Chart positions: #37 (UK Singles Chart), #84 (Japan)
"Without You"
- Released: 25 July 2005
- Chart positions: #30 (UK), #9 (Japan)
"Rocket" (re-issue)
- Released: 10 October 2005
- Chart positions: #48 (UK), #26 (Japan), #5 (Scotland)
"Turn This Thing Around"
- Released: 6 February 2006
- Chart positions: #39 UK, #11 (Scotland), #94 (Japan) #9 (UK Airplay Chart)

=== International releases ===
==== Japan ====
Information
"Turn This Thing Around EP"
- Released: 4 May 2006
- Chart positions: #94 Japanese Singles chart

== See also ==
- List of performers on Top of the Pops
- List of bands from Glasgow
- List of Scottish musicians
- Music of Scotland
