= Mhallami =

Arabic-speaking tribal ethnic group of Turkey

Total population
- 150,000-500,000 or 800,000

Regions with significant populations
- Turkey, Lebanon, Germany, Sweden, Denmark, The Netherlands, Belgium

Languages
- North Mesopotamian Arabic

Religion
- Predominantly Sunni Islam

Related ethnic groups
- Assyrians, Kurds, Arabs

The Mhallami people, also known as Mardelli or alternatively spelled as Mahallami (Arabic: المُحَلَّمِيَّة, romanized: Al-Muḥallamiyya) are an Arab ethnic group traditionally living in and around the city of Mardin, Turkey.

Although scholars sometimes debate the precise origins of the Mhallami, they are generally regarded as Arabs, and the majority typically identified as such.

They are Sunni Muslims with a small Syriac Christian minority. They speak Mhallami, a distinct dialect of North Mesopotamian Arabic with heavy Turkish, Kurdish, and Aramaic influence.

Determining the exact number of Mhallami today is difficult for a number of reasons, but sources generally state numbers as low as 150,000 and as high being around 1 million. Due to migration since 1920 they have a large presence in Lebanon, but as a result of the Lebanese Civil War, large numbers fled to Europe, particularly Germany, where they now form the largest community in the diaspora. Mhallami generally have a poor reputation due to their affiliation with low education, criminal activities, and clan structure; however, a number are also affiliated with positions of law and politics, and are regarded as having been mild-mannered.

== Etymology ==
The name Mhallami is believed to derive from Muhallem, who is recorded in Arab genealogical traditions (ansab) as one of the descendants of Nizar.

The term Mhallami is believed to be a combination of the Arabic words mahalam (Arabic: محلم, lit. 'house') and mia (Arabic: مائة, lit. '100'). The name traces its origins to the Hasankeyf Chronicle, which details the region that the Mhallami lived in as Mardin-Midyat. Differing pronunciations in the word exist since mahalam doesn't have any unique vowels, and most Mhallami aren't opposed to them. Alternatively, the term Mardelli is used in reference to the city of Mardin, where many Mhallami originate from.

Another theory proposes that the term Mhallami is derived from Beth Ahlam (Syriac: ܒܝܬ ܡܚܠܡ, romanized: Beth Mḥallam), a historical settlement in Tur'Abdin, which is believed to have been named after the ancient Ahlamu-Aramean tribe from whom the Mhallami are thought to possibly descend.

== Origin ==
The main sources on the lineage and migration of the Arabs are the genealogical records known as ansab (pedigrees). In studies about the Mhallami, the genealogical tradition points to a connection with Rabia ibn Nizar. Nizar, considered among the Adnanites, is described as the ancestor of two major tribal branches: Rabia and Mudar. Each of these branches included a number of important tribes.

Others state that the origin of the Mhallami in Anatolia are believed to be in the early periods of the Middle Ages, and they lived a nomadic lifestyle. However, research on their origins is difficult since there are no known written records by their ancestors of this period. Among the Mhallami there is a view that they are descended from Banu Hilal tribes, but historical sources and research indicate that this is somewhat unlikely. Arab ancestry is more probably from Rabi'ah tribes, possibly Banu Shayban, though this does not preclude other possible roots. Today, many Mhallami retain Arabic names and use them to refer to themselves or their families/clans, and speak a unique dialect of North Mesopotamian Arabic (Qeltu) which is distinct from other dialects.

There also exist theories that the origins of the Mhallami are ethnically Assyrian, given that their roots trace back to the ancient history of the region as well as Tur Abdin. The theory is supported by orientalist Ishaq Armala and by Syriac Orthodox patriarch Ignatius Aphrem I, who indicated that the Syriac Christians who converted to Islam under pressure started calling themselves Mhalmoye at the end of the 17th century. Some sources view the group as ethnically or denominationally Assyrian. The causes of the Islamization of the Mhallami are cited as salvation from persecution, inner divisions of the Syriac-rite churches, and conflict preceding the Treaty of Nasuh Pasha. Some Mhallami who still live in Turkey have identified with Assyrian roots, and to this day, the group shares traditions and cultural elements with Assyrians in Turkey such as the dance of Kathfothe (Syriac: ܪܩܕܐ ܕܐ ܟܬܦܬܐ).

The Mhallami are also sometimes associated with ethnic Kurds, and theories have persisted that they may be of Kurdish origin, stating that after the original migration of the Arab tribes to Mesopotamia, the Mhallami adopted several Kurdish traditions. While most Mhallami identified as Arabs, a large part of the group identified as Kurds. As the dispute was widespread, there was no Mhallami tribe which fully identified with either the Arabs or Kurds; even nuclear families had heavy disputes amongst each other over ethnic origin.

== History ==
=== Early modern history ===
Many Mhallami are originally from the Mardin area of southeastern Turkey, namely the district of Midyat. Although many had since migrated outside of Mesopotamia, there were still a community of Mardelli living in the Tur Abdin region as of the late 90's, with some reported to have performed maintenance of the Mor Gabriel Monastery. Today, many of these Mhallami still inhabit Assyrian villages in southeastern Turkey such as Gercüş and İçören.

The first migration of the Mhallami was to Lebanon in the 1920s to flee persecution under the government of Mustafa Kemal Atatürk. By the 1940s, tens of thousands more came to Lebanon, but they were not naturalized as citizens and as a result, their clan structures grew tighter to ensure their survival. The Mhallami had traditionally settled in large numbers in Lebanese regions such as Tripoli, the Beqaa Valley and Beirut, having a population between 70,000 and 100,000 Mhallami prior to Lebanese Civil War. Typically, they would find settlement in the parts of Beirut that were poorer than others, and they often received little to no education.

The Mhallami were among the civil war refugees from Lebanon who came to Germany and other European countries such as the Netherlands, Denmark and Sweden since 1976 and have since been partially tolerated or live as asylum seekers. Their origin and legal status became a particular concern when they started to seek asylum in Western European countries en masse in the early 1980s, since many were considered stateless peoples and some had even discarded their previous documentation.

=== Modern history ===
In 2015, the founding chairman of the first Mhallami association in Turkey, Mehmet Ali Aslan, became the first Mhallami to be elected a member of the Turkish Parliament from the HDP party. The group has also become more active in preserving culture and uniting their community, with 1st International Mhallami Symposium being held in 2008 to discuss their origins and bring the community together.

As of 2014, the leader of the Mhallami in Turkey was lawyer Şeyhmus Miroğlu, whose family was politically active in the leading Justice and Development Party of Recep Tayyip Erdoğan. Miroğlu's brother, Orhan Miroğlu, is also active in Turkish politics.

With around 8,000 people, Berlin has the largest Mhallami diaspora community in Europe (as of June 2003). Essen also has a sizable population of Mhallami, with the majority of the "Lebanese" community there being of Mardelli origin.

Certain families of Mhallami have been known to engage in criminal activities following their move to the diaspora, owing to their tightly knitted clan structure and their larger inability to integrate with their new society. In Sweden, some families in places such as Gothenburg and Jönköping are part of these activities, while in Germany, the Miri-Clan and the Remmo family have also been involved with the criminal scene of Europe. Often times, the level of crime is due to familial conflicts, which originates from their tribal structures. These groups also exist in the Netherlands.

== See also ==
- Arabs in Turkey
- Miri-Clan
- Al-Zein clan
- Ömerli, Mardin

== Bibliography ==
- Barsoum, Aphrem (2008). The History of Tur Abdin. Translated by Matti Moosa. Gorgias Press.
- Bozkurt, Abdülbaki (30 April 2020). "The Historical Roots of the Mhallami Arabs in Turkey as a Subject of Debate" (PDF). Journal of International Social Research. 13 (70): 192–202. doi:10.17719/jisr.2020.4086 (inactive 13 October 2025). Archived from the original (PDF) on 6 May 2020.
- Donabed, Sargon; Mako, Shamiran (1 September 2009). "Ethno-Cultural and Religious Identity of Syrian Orthodox Christians". Revue d'Histoire de l'Université de Balamand. ISSN 1608-7526 – via SSRN.
- Jaraba, Mahmoud (10 March 2023). ""Clan Crime" in Germany: Migration Politics, Socio-Economic Conditions, and Intergenerational Transmission of Criminal Behavior". In Siegel, Dina (ed.). Organized Crime in the 21st Century: Motivations, Opportunities, and Constraints. The Netherlands: Springer Nature. ISBN 978-3-031-21575-9.
- Kern, Laurenz W (2015). "Kurden, Araber, Scheinlibanesen: Die vielschichtige Ethnizität der Mḥallami". Wiener Zeitschrift für die Kunde des Morgenlandes. 105: 189–202. JSTOR 24754818 – via JSTOR.
- Jastrow, Otto (2014). The position of Mardin Arabic in the Mesopotamian–Levantine dialect continuum. Harrassowitz Verlag. pp. 117–189. doi:10.2307/j.ctvc2rmgq.13.
