= One Records (Scotland) =

One Records is a Scottish record label.

== Current artists ==
- El Presidente a Scottish glam-rock band fronted by Dante Gizzi.
- We Are The Physics a Scottish indie band.
- Xcerts a Scottish pop/rock band.

== Past artists ==
- Matchsticks a pop/electro band from Glasgow.
- Fickle Public a Glasgow indie band.
- Drive-by Argument
- Ludovico

== See also ==
- List of record labels
