= Julian of Mesopotamia =

Julian the Hermit of Mesopotamia adopted the ascetic life during the reign of Roman emperor Julian the Apostate in the fourth century AD. Saint Julian dwelt in solitude near the river Euphrates.

In his solitude, Julian heard from God that the apostate emperor would soon die. The emperor's death quickly came to pass as the Lord had revealed to Julian.

Through the efforts of St. Julian, a church was built on Mount Sinai in memory of the obtaining of the tablets of the Law by the holy Prophet Moses on the spot where Moses was standing when he received the tablets.

Venerable Julian the Hermit of Mesopotamia is commemorated on 18 October in the Eastern Orthodox, Byzantine Catholic, and Roman Catholic Churches.

== See also ==
- Desert Fathers
- Stylites
