= Mercimekli, Midyat =

Village in Mardin Province, Turkey

Mercimekli
- Neighbourhood
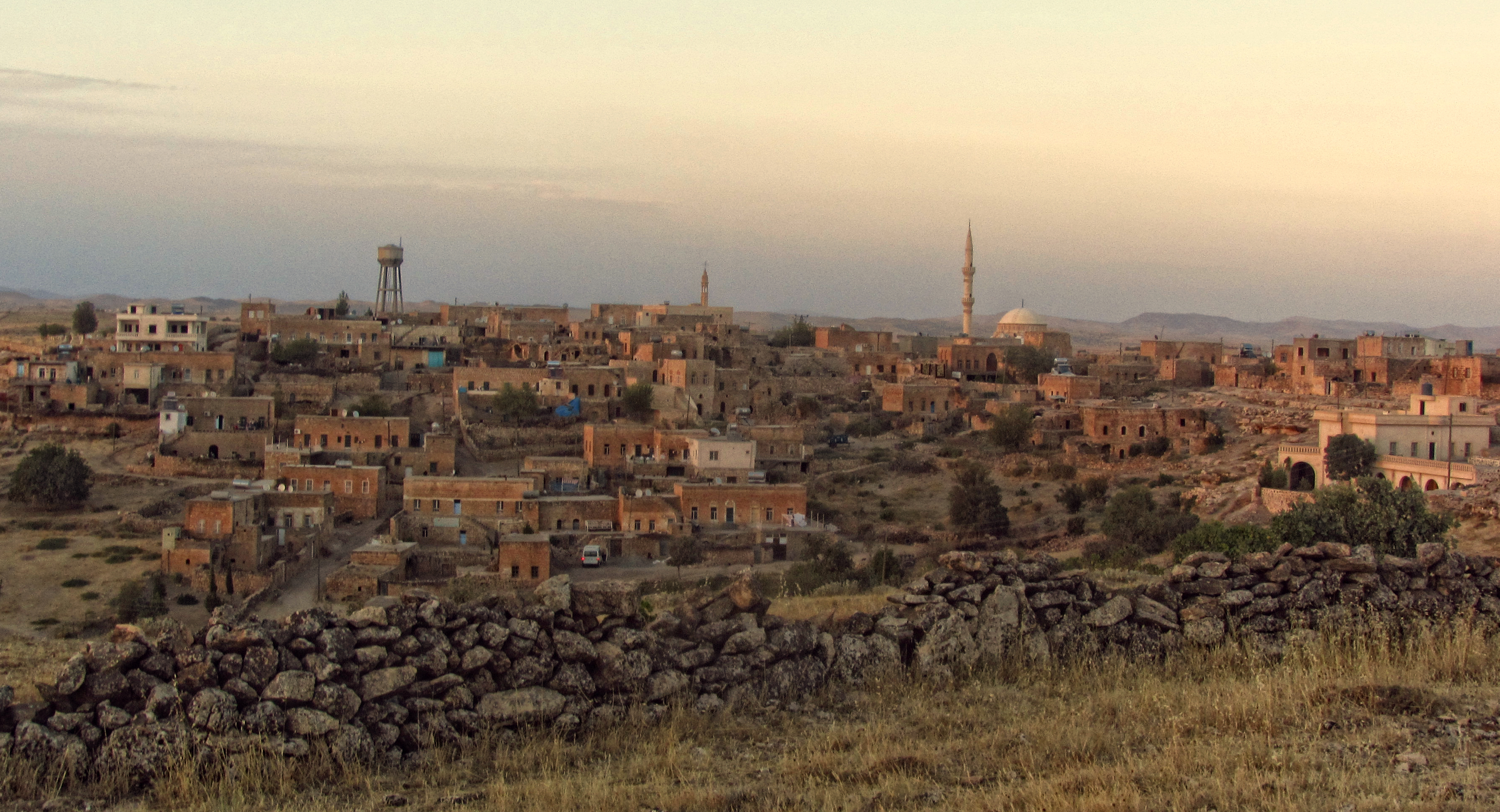

- Location within Turkey
- Coordinates: 37.470°N 41.338°E
- Country: Turkey
- Province: Mardin
- District: Midyat
- Population (2021): 304
- Time zone: UTC+3 (TRT)

Mercimekli (Note: "village of lentils" in Turkish.) (Arabic: حبسناس; Kurdish: Hapisnas; (Note: Also spelt as Habsus or Ḥabsnâs.) Syriac: ܚܒܣܢܐܣ, romanized: Habsnas) (Note: Alternatively transliterated as Habisnas, Habses, Habsenas, Habsenus, Ḥabsenus, Ḥabsis, Ḥabsus, Ḥabsūs, Ḥafsinas, Hapsdnäs, Hapsenas, Hapsus, or Hbûşyo Nêşe. Nisba: Ḥabsōyo or Habisnāsī. Demonym: Habsisoye.) is a neighbourhood in the municipality and district of Midyat, Mardin Province in Turkey. The village is populated by Syriacs, Zaza Kurds, and Mhallami and had a population of 304 in 2021. It is located in the historic region of Bēth Muḥallam in Tur Abdin.

In the village, there is the Church of Mar Shim’un. (Note: The church was originally dedicated to Simon Peter.)

== History ==
The Church of Mar Shim’un at Habsnas (today called Mercimekli) was built at the beginning of the sixth century or shortly afterwards. The village is mentioned in the Life of Mar Gabriel of Beth Qustan (593–667). Simeon of the Olives (d. 734), metropolitan bishop of Harran, was born at Habsnas in 657 AD and renovated its church, founded a school at the village, and established the nearby Mor Loʿozor Monastery. The monk Ayyub (Job) of Manim’am, who wrote the vita of Mar Shim’un Zaytuni at the end of the ninth century or the beginning of the tenth century, may have been educated at the school at Habsnas. The monk Habib of Habsnas was a renowned calligrapher (fl. 1170). Dionysius Isaiah of Habsnas was metropolitan bishop of the Monastery of the Cross and Hah in 1453–1463. In the Syriac Orthodox patriarchal register of dues of 1870, it was recorded that the village had 42 households, who paid 132 dues, and was served by the Church of Morī Šem'ūn, the Morī Loʿozor Monastery, and the Church of Morī Osyō and one monk and one priest.

In 1914, it was inhabited by 450 Syriacs, as per the list presented to the Paris Peace Conference by the Assyro-Chaldean delegation. The Syriacs adhered to the Syriac Orthodox Church. Amidst the Sayfo, the village was attacked by Kurds of the Rama tribe on 11 June during the night and fighting continued into the following day. Some villagers fled to Midyat and reported the battle to their co-religionists who appealed to the kaymakam of Midyat to aid the Syriacs at Habsnas. The Kurds were chased off by soldiers sent by the kaymakam of Midyat and fifteen soldiers were left to guard the village. Upon the outbreak of fighting at Midyat, a Yazidi herdsman warned the Syriacs of Habsnas to expect another attack and thus most of them took refuge at ‘Ayn-Wardo with their property and about 200 Syriacs who remained were massacred by the soldiers and Kurds of the Rama tribe.

The population of the village was 560 in 1960. There were 380 Turoyo-speaking Christians in 56 families in 1966. One Armenian family inhabited the village in 1980. In the late 20th century, Syriacs at Habsnas emigrated to Sweden, Belgium, and Germany. The church was restored in the early 2000s. A mosque was constructed in 2003.

== Demography ==
The following is a list of the number of Syriac families that have inhabited Habsnas per year stated. Unless otherwise stated, all figures are from the list provided in The Syrian Orthodox Christians in the Late Ottoman Period and Beyond: Crisis then Revival, as noted in the bibliography below.

- 1915: 100
- 1966: 56
- 1978: 42
- 1979: 38
- 1981: 33
- 1987: 10
- 1995: 3
- 2013: 1

== Bibliography ==
- Andrews, Peter Alford; Benninghaus, Rüdiger, eds. (1989). Ethnic Groups in the Republic of Turkey.
- Barsoum, Aphrem (2003). The Scattered Pearls: A History of Syriac Literature and Sciences. Translated by Matti Moosa (2nd ed.). Gorgias Press.
- Barsoum, Aphrem (2008a). History of the Za'faran Monastery. Translated by Matti Moosa. Gorgias Press.
- Barsoum, Aphrem (2008b). The History of Tur Abdin. Translated by Matti Moosa. Gorgias Press.
- Bcheiry, Iskandar (2009). The Syriac Orthodox Patriarchal Register of Dues of 1870: An Unpublished Historical Document from the Late Ottoman Period. Gorgias Press.
- Bcheiry, Iskandar (2010). Collection of Historical Documents in Relation with the Syriac Orthodox Community in the Late Period of the Ottoman Empire: The Register of Mardin MS 1006. Gorgias Press.
- Bell, Gertrude (1982). The Churches and Monasteries of the Ṭur ʻAbdin. Pindar Press.
- Biner, Zerrin Özlem (2020). States of Dispossession: Violence and Precarious Coexistence in Southeast Turkey. University of Pennsylvania Press.
- Courtois, Sébastien de (2004). The Forgotten Genocide: Eastern Christians, The Last Arameans. Translated by Vincent Aurora. Gorgias Press.
- Courtois, Sébastien de (2013). "Tur Abdin : Réflexions sur l'état présent descommunautés syriaques du Sud-Est de la Turquie, mémoire, exils, retours". Cahier du Gremmamo (in French). 21: 113–150.
- Dinno, Khalid S. (2017). The Syrian Orthodox Christians in the Late Ottoman Period and Beyond: Crisis then Revival. Gorgias Press.
- Gaunt, David (2006). Massacres, Resistance, Protectors: Muslim-Christian Relations in Eastern Anatolia during World War I. Gorgias Press.
- Hoyland, Robert G.; Brunner, Kyle B.; Tannous, Jack Boulos Victor (2021). The Life of Simeon of the Olives: An Entrepreneurial Saint of Early Islamic North Mesopotamia. Gorgias Press LLC. ISBN 978-1-4632-4346-3.
- Jongerden, Joost; Verheij, Jelle, eds. (2012). Social Relations in Ottoman Diyarbekir, 1870-1915. Brill.
- Keser-Kayaalp, Elif, ed. (January 2022). Syriac Architectural Heritage at Risk in TurʿAbdin (PDF).
- Palmer, Andrew (1990). Monk and Mason on the Tigris Frontier: The Early History of Tur Abdin. Cambridge University Press.
- Ritter, Hellmut (1967). Turoyo: Die Volkssprache der Syrischen Christen des Tur 'Abdin (in German). Vol. 1. Franz Steiner Verlag.
- Sinclair, T.A. (1989). Eastern Turkey: An Architectural & Archaeological Survey. Vol. III. Pindar Press.
- Tan, Altan (2018). Turabidin'den Berriye'ye. Aşiretler - Dinler - Diller - Kültürler (in Turkish). Pak Ajans Yayincilik Turizm Ve Diş Ticaret Limited şirketi. ISBN 9789944360944.
- Travis, Hannibal, ed. (2018). The Assyrian Genocide: Cultural and Political Legacies (PDF). Routledge.
