= Simeon of the Olives =

8th century Syriac Orthodox bishop

Simeon of the Olives (Shimʿun Zaytuni, 624–734) was a Syriac Orthodox bishop of Harran from Ḥabsenus in the eight century. He is attributed to have built or rebuilt several churches and monasteries in the region around Nisibis, such as the Mor Loʿozor Monastery.

== Biography ==
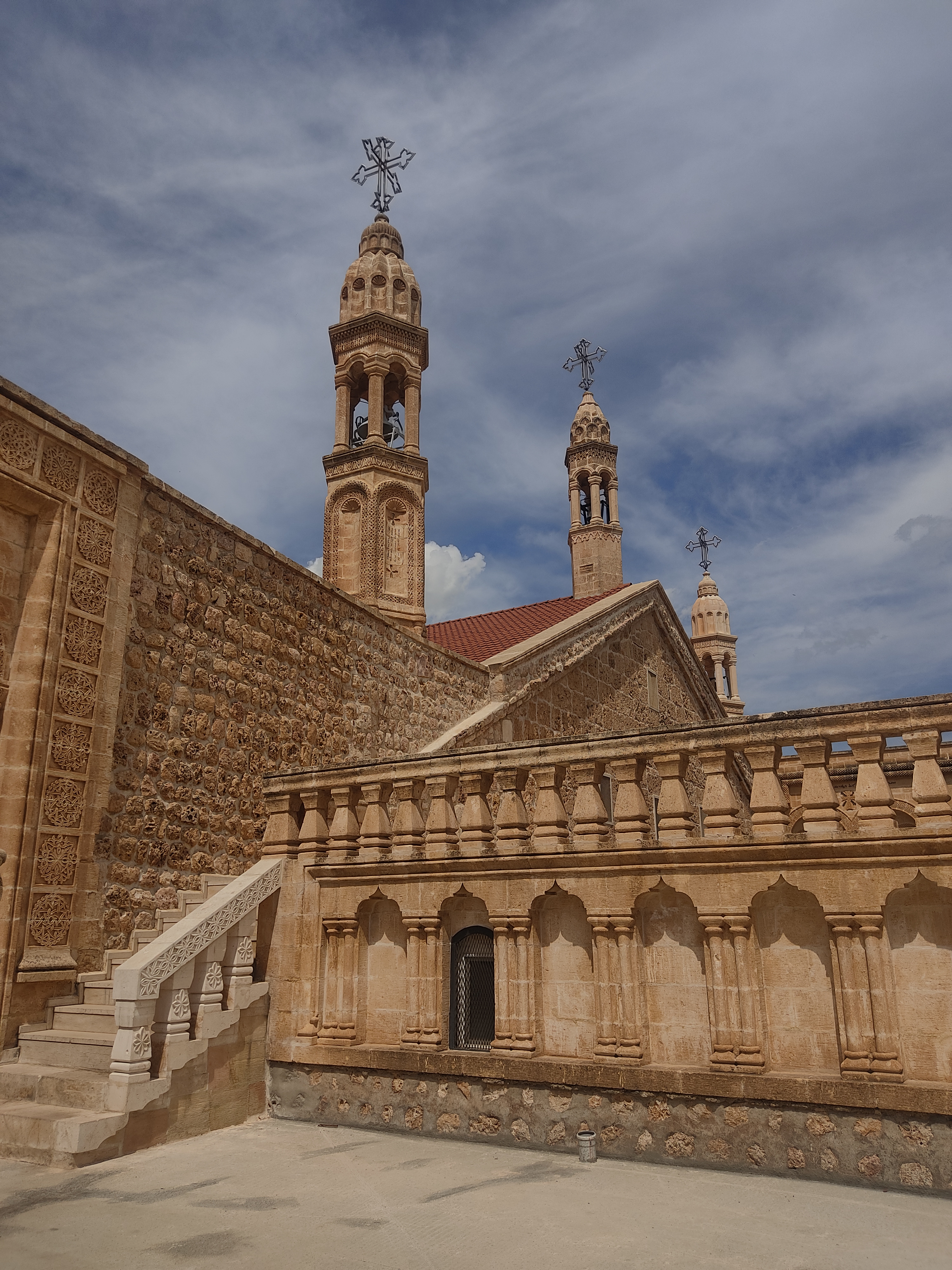
Simeon lived as monk at the Mor Gabriel Monastery (also known as Monastery of Qartmin)

According to his vita, Simeon was born in the village of Ḥabsenus in the Tur Abdin in 624/5, though others date his birth later to 657. He first learned how to read and write at his village church and was then sent to the monastic school at the Qartmin Abbey at the age of ten. At the age of fifteen he became a monk and at twenty-five, a priest. While still a youth, he was trampled to death at the feast of Mor Gabriel (possibly Gabriel's funeral) and miraculously revived upon being placed on the saint's tomb. Simeon also lived as a stylite for some time in the Monastery of the Column in Sīrwān close to Nisibis and finally became abbot of the Qartmin Abbey.

At some point, his nephew David came upon a treasure which he made available to Simeon who used it to take care of the poor, restoring churches and monasteries in the region and buying property and equipment for the monastery. On the newly purchased land he planted some twelve thousand olive trees, which earned him the sobriquet "of the olives".

In June 700, Simeon was consecrated by a synod of bishops as bishop of Harran after the previous bishop, Elias, had died. Nevertheless, he remained in close contact with the monastery of Qartmin which he visited every year after the feast of Pentecost. Around the year 707, he had a great church dedicated to Saint Theodosius the martyr built in Nisibis which he consecrated together with the patriarch Julian II the Roman. He also stayed connected to his home village of Ḥabsenus where he founded or refounded the Mor Loʿozor Monastery and translated the relics of Mor Loʿozor (Mor Lazarus) from Harran, another stylite saint, also building a column for recluses for it.

Around 731, Simeon retired due to his age to Qartmin Abbey where he died and was buried on either June 1st or 3rd. The Syriac Church commemorates Simeon on June 3rd. The local church in Ḥabsenus (today Mercimekli) is dedicated to Simeon.

== Sources ==
The major source for Simeon's life is his vita, which, together with the vita of Theodotus of Amid, belongs to the two major pieces of Syriac Orthodox hagiography written in the Islamic period. The author names himself as a certain Job (Ayyub of Manimʿam), like Simeon a native of Ḥabsenus, and claims to be a nephew of Simeon's nephew David.

While the vita of Simeon was probably written within several decades after his death, all manuscripts containing it are dated to either the late nineteenth or twentieth century and some of the events described, especially those that clearly take place after 734, have been added by later hand. Nevertheless, some of the information in the vita is also referenced in the fenqitho (a Syriac Orthodox service book that contains hymns, chants, and canons for various feast and saint's days) of the Qartmin Abbey and the vita of Mor Gabriel though these sources also include conflicting information or information not included in the vita.

Jack Tannous argues that rather than reading the vita as a source for the Umayyad period, it reflects the changing situations of Christian communities in the Abbasid period and the anachronistic parts might have been written to justify the existence of newly built or renovated churches, something that was forbidden by Islamic law.

== Modern translations ==
A critical edition and translation of the Syriac Life of Simeon of the Olives into English was published in 2021 by a collaborative effort involving Robert G. Hoyland, Sebastian Brock, Kyle Brunner, and Jack Tannous.

== Bibliography ==
- Barsoum, Aphrem (2008). Moosa, Matti (trsl.) (ed.). The History of Tur Abdin. Gorgias Press. ISBN 978-1-59333-715-5.
- Hoyland, Robert G.; Brunner, Kyle B.; Tannous, Jack Boulos Victor (2021). The Life of Simeon of the Olives: An Entrepreneurial Saint of Early Islamic North Mesopotamia. Gorgias Press LLC. ISBN 978-1-4632-4346-3.
- Kayaalp, Elif Keser (2021). Church Architecture of Late Antique Northern Mesopotamia. Oxford University Press. ISBN 978-0-19-886493-6.
- Tannous, Jack (2016). "The Life of Simeon of the Olives: A Christian Puzzle from Islamic Syria". In Kreiner, J.; Reimitz, H. (eds.). Motions of Late Antiquity: Essays on Religion, Politics, and Society in Honour of Peter Brown. Turnhout: Brepols. pp. 309–330.
