= Mor Loʿozor Monastery =

Monastery in Mardin, Turkey

- Location within Turkey Location within Near East

Monastery information
- Denomination: Syriac Orthodox
- Established: 5th or 8th century
- Dedication: Mor Lazarus the Edessan

People
- Founder: Mor Lazarus or Mor Shemʿun d-Zaite

Site
- Location: Near Mardin, Turkey
- Coordinates: 37°28′21″N 41°20′13″E
- Public access: yes
- Other information: Defunct

The Mor Loʿozor Monastery was a Syriac Orthodox monastery in the vicinity of Mercimekli, the ancient Habsenas, in the Tur Abdin.

== History ==
The monastery was named after Mor Lazarus the Edessan, who was an ascetic and bishop of Harran in the fourth century. There are two conflicting narratives regarding its foundation. According to the first, the monastery was founded by Mor Lazarus, who was at the time the bishop of Harran, while according to the second, it was founded by Mor Shemʿun d-Zaite (Simeon of the Olives), who translated the bones of Mor Lazarus into the monastery. It is also possible that Shemʿun refounded the monastery during his time as bishop (between 700 and 734).

The oldest parts of the monastery may go back to the 5th or 6th century. The monastery was located only around 300 meters from the village of Habsenas, indicating the close relation between the villagers and the monastery. The monastery seems to have continued stylite practices in the eight century, after the region had fallen under Islamic rule after 640, making it unique. The aims seems to have to continue this ascetic tradition and the monks of the monastery took turn to live as recluses on top of the columns.

The monk Sergius of Hah created a copy of the Prayer Book of Monks at the monastery of Mor Loʿozor around the year 1500.

In 1866 the monastery was renovated after having been ruined for many years.

== Architecture ==
Mor Lo'zor as situated in the Tub Abdin

The monastery has a square plan, with structures in the west, north and east, and is surrounded by a three meter high wall. Its most distinguishing feature is the seclusion tower in the middle of the courtyard, which, though the upper section has collapsed, still is about seven meters high. This matches with the description of the vita of Shem'un, though the inscribed construction date does not match with the vita and might therefore have been built in the place of Shem'un's tower. Contrary to the column of Simeon the Younger near Antioch which consisted of a monolithic column or the composite column of Simeon the Elder, the column is built of masonry, wider than most other columns and has a channel on the ground floor for collecting and discharging water.

== Present state ==
The monastery has been abandoned and has been partially vandalised, including graffiti as well as illegal excavations. The deterioration of the building could result in the loss of the seclusion tower, the last surviving sample in the region.

The monastery is tentatively listed with other Late Antique and Medieval Churches and Monasteries of Midyat and Surrounding Area (Tur ʿAbdin) by UNESCO since 2021.

== Bibliography ==
- Barış, Altan (January 2022). Kayaalp, Elif Keser (ed.). Syriac Architectural Heritage at Risk in TurʿAbdin (PDF). Association for the Protection of Cultural Heritage. ISBN 978-605-06335-9-7.
- Barsoum, Aphrem (2008). Moosa, Matti (ed.). The History of Tur Abdin. New Jersey: Gorgias Press. p. 20.
- Kayaalp, Elif Keser (2021). Church Architecture of Late Antique Northern Mesopotamia. Oxford University Press. ISBN 978-0-19-886493-6.
- Sinclair, T. A. (31 December 1989). Eastern Turkey: "An Architectural and Archaeological Survey, Volume III". Pindar Press. ISBN 978-1-904597-76-6.
