= Mor Gabriel Monastery =

Syriac Orthodox site in Turkey

Monastery of St. Gabriel ܕܝܪܐ ܕܡܪܝ ܓܒܪܐܝܠ
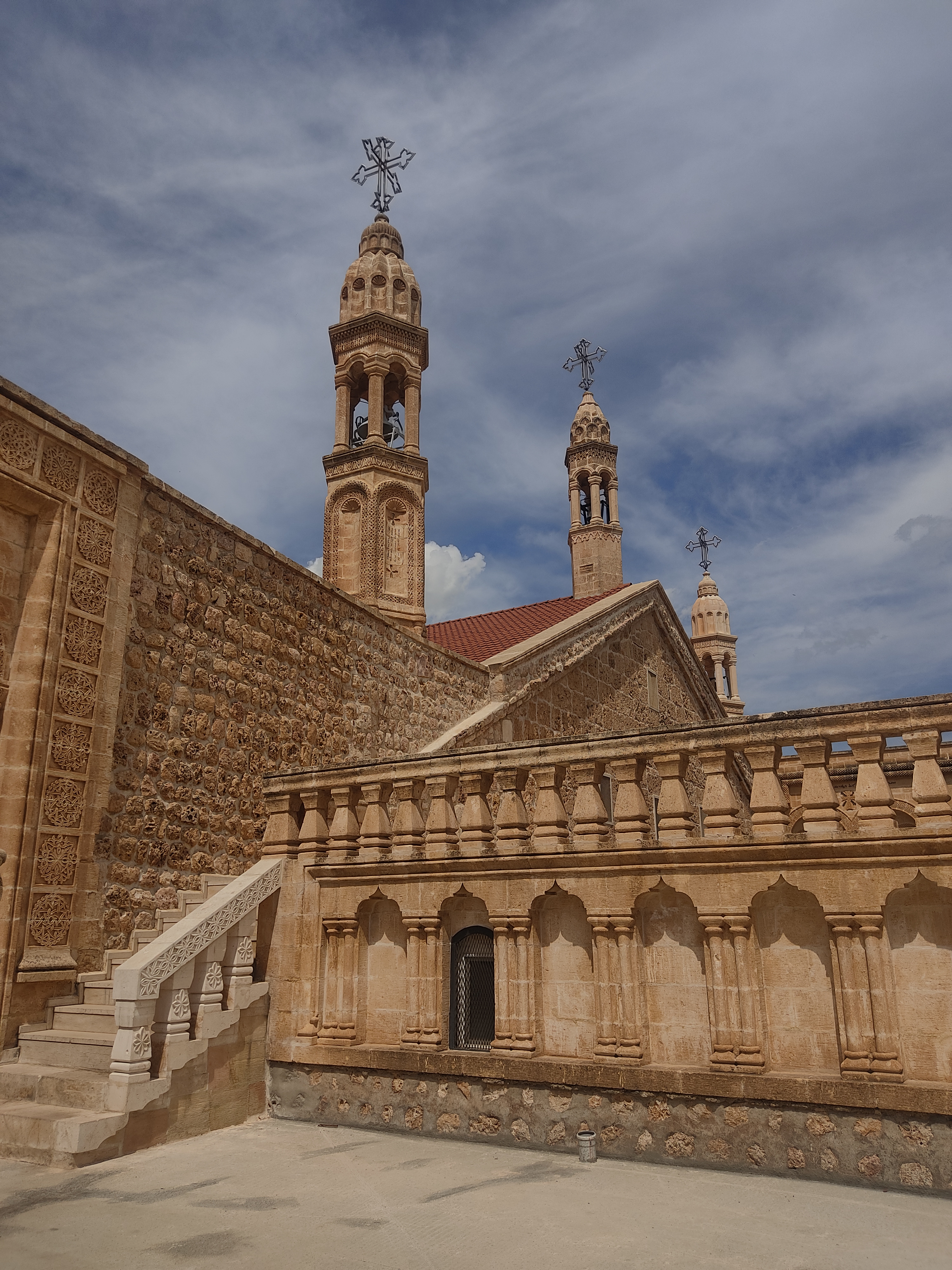
- Towers of the monastery's churches

- Location within Turkey

Monastery information
- Other names: Dayro d-Mor Gabriel; Deyrulumur
- Order: Syriac Orthodox Church
- Established: 397
- Dedication: Saint Gabriel of Beth Qustan
- Diocese: Diocese of Tur Abdin
- Controlled churches: Saint Gabriel Church, Church of the Virgin Mary, Church of the Forty Martyrs of Sebaste

People
- Founders: Mor Samuel and Mor Simon
- Abbot: Mor Timotheos Aktas

Site
- Coordinates: 37°19′18.4″N 41°32′18.6″E

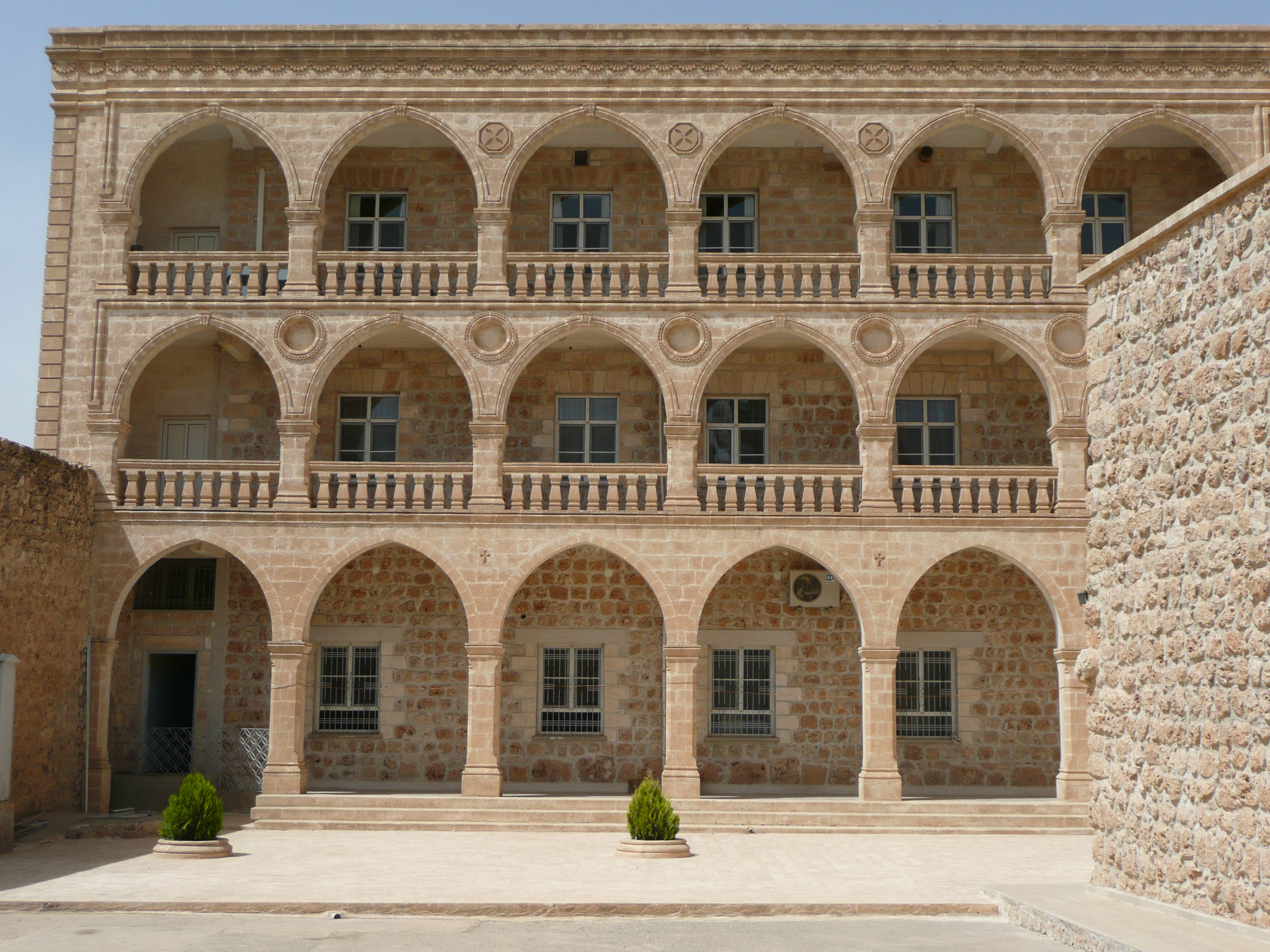
A building complex on one side of the monastery

The Monastery of Saint Gabriel (Syriac: ܕܝܪܐ ܕܡܪܝ ܓܒܪܐܝܠ; Dayro d-Mor Gabriel), also known as Monastery of Qartmin, Deir el-ʿUmr, Deyrulumur, and in Turkish, Mor Gabriel Manastırı, is a Syriac Orthodox monastery located near Midyat in the Tur Abdin region of southeastern Turkey. Founded in 397 AD by the ascetics Mor Shmuel of Qartmin and Mor Shemʿun of Qartmin, it is one of the oldest surviving Assyrian monasteries in the world and one of the oldest continuously active Christian monasteries in existence.

The monastery has elaborate decorations that have been added over the centuries, starting when the location served as a Zoroastrian temple and continuing to this day. It comprises several structures, including the main church, the Dome of Theodora, a mausoleum, and other buildings; it also houses the relics of its namesake, Gabriel of Beth Qustan. The monastery remains a popular pilgrimage site and functions as a religious and social centre for the remaining Christian Assyrians.

Throughout its history, it has served for centuries as a major centre of Syriac monasticism, theology and cultural preservation for the Syriac‑speaking Christian community. From Turco‑Mongol raids, to Byzantine imperial persecution, to contemporary land and legal disputes with the Turkish state, it has endured many periods of conflict and persecution, yet survives today as a monastic centre; legal disputes brought by the Turkish state and local Kurdish authorities against the indigenous community, however, are ongoing. The monastery currently serves as the seat of the metropolitan of Tur Abdin.

== History ==
The Monastery of Mor Gabriel is situated in the heart of Tur Abdin, on a caldera formed by an ancient meteorite impact, evidenced by the presence of broken quartz fragments. Like many other monasteries in the region, it was constructed using stone blocks from a pre-Christian temple, with its eastern wall preserved from the original Zoroastrian sanctuary. Architectural slits in the one-metre-thick walls are aligned with the summer solstice, reflecting the solar cult practices of that earlier tradition.

According to the Life of Shmuel, the origins of the monastery date back to the late 4th century. Shmuel (Samuel), a disciple of the martyred Bishop Karpos who had been killed by Persian raiders, fled into the hills and came to the village of Qartmin. There he acquired a disciple, Shem‘un (Simon), and together they lived in a temple that is now identified with the "Arches of Mor Gabriel". Simon experienced a vision of an angel commanding him to build a Beth Slutho (open-air enclosure for prayer) further west, marked by three large stone blocks. When they located the spot, they began the foundation of what became the Monastery of Mor Gabriel. Around forty years later, in 397, the Roman emperor formally recognised and endowed the institution.

By the 6th century the monastery's reputation had grown considerably, and its community swelled to over 1,000 monks, including both local Assyrians and Copts. Its fame was such that it attracted donations and benefactions from Eastern Roman emperors Arcadius, Honorius, Theodosius II and Anastasius. Toward the end of the century, Simeon of the Olives, a former monk of Mor Gabriel who later became bishop of Harran, renovated the monastery with funds discovered in a buried treasure.

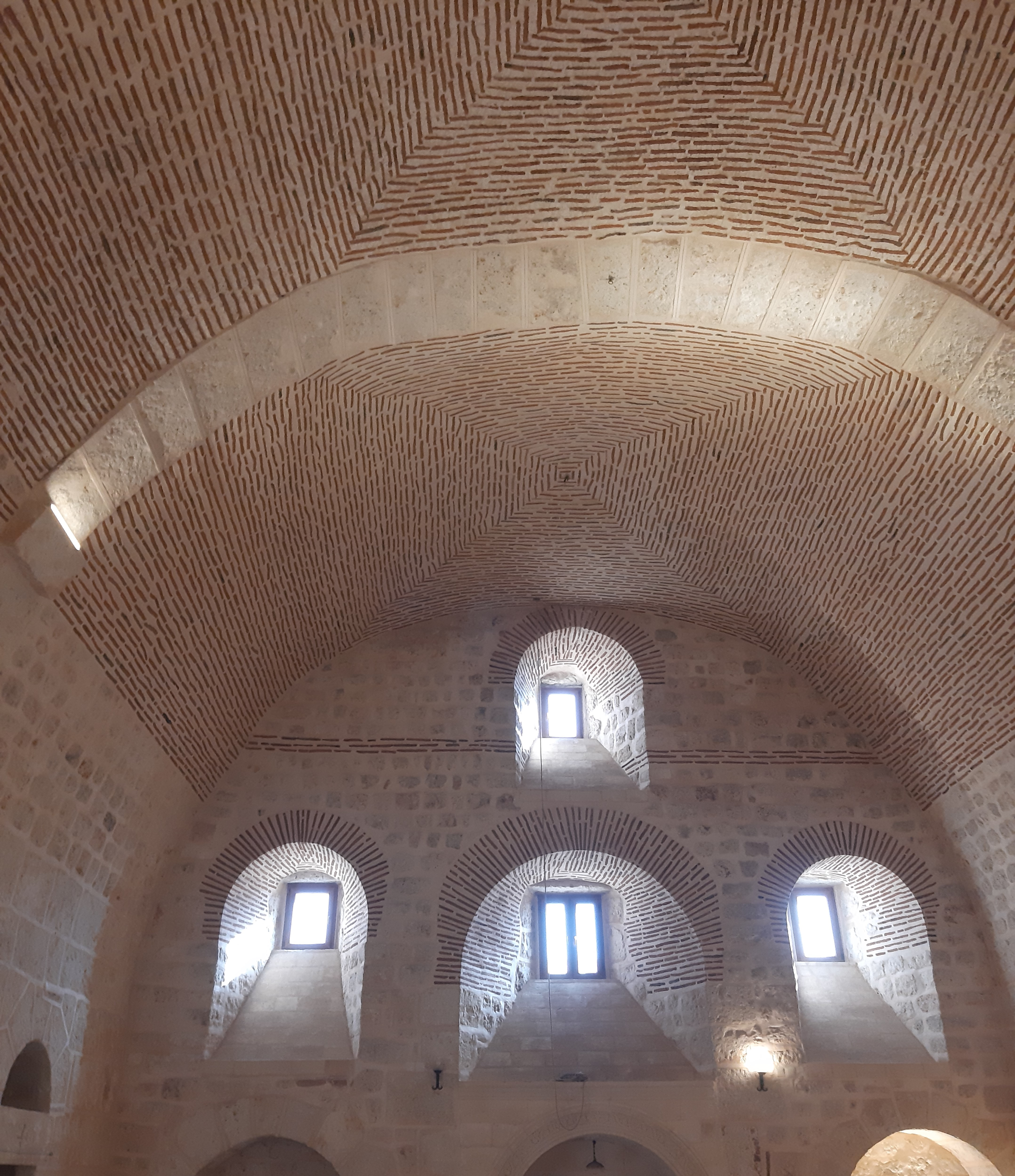
Transverse arches of the main church

Following the Council of Chalcedon in 451, the staunchly Miaphysite stronghold of Tur Abdin, including Mor Gabriel, rejected the council's decrees and forfeited the benefactions of Emperor Marcian, a determined supporter of Chalcedon. Later, Emperor Anastasius, who opposed the council, restored imperial patronage. He financed the construction of a new church with a large prayer hall that still functions as the monastery's main church today, and added the "Dome of Theodora", an octagonal structure originally built as a baptistery and later repurposed as a kitchen. Empress Theodora, revered as a saint in the Syriac Orthodox Church, maintained a close friendship with the monks and visited Qartmin, after which the dome was named in her honour following her visit.

Emperor Anastasius also supported the growth of the monastic community after hearing of its renown, which at the time numbered some 300 monks. He provided extensive resources for its expansion and renovation, including blacksmiths and building materials. Throughout its history, the monastery has been home to numerous high-ranking clerics and scholars, including four patriarchs, a maphrian, and 84 bishops. Among those who later studied at Mor Gabriel are four patriarchs of the Syriac Orthodox Church: Theodosius Roman, Dionysius III, Basilius V, and Ignatius Behnam of Hidl.

During the Islamic conquests, Bishop Gabriel of Beth Qustan, then overseeing two dioceses, negotiated a peace treaty with Arab forces that protected the rights of Christians in Tur Abdin. His reputation endured for generations, especially after a devastating plague in 774 killed 94 monks at Qartmin. The body of Gabriel was placed upright in the church as an intercessor, and his right arm was carried to Hah to end the outbreak there. From this point onward, it began to be called the Monastery of St. Gabriel.

Despite its prominence, the monastery endured repeated devastations. In 580 it was attacked and burned by Persian forces. In 1100 both the monastery and its neighboring village were pillaged by Turkish raiders, who massacred locals, destroyed manuscripts, and looted precious metals and furniture. Further destruction followed in 1296 at the hands of the Tatars. In the 14th century, Mongol forces invaded, killing 440 monks. In 1394, the armies of Tamerlane besieged the monastery. Many clergy sought refuge in the Cave of Ibn Siqi, but Tamerlane set it aflame, killing over 500 people by suffocation. The monastery was later rebuilt in 1502 with assistance from the local community of Basibrina.

By the 13th century, Eli of Qartmin had become the monastery's patron saint. Though little is known of his life, he is remembered as a monastic author who composed a metrical biography of Philoxenus of Mabbug.

The monastery also became an important site of scholarship and manuscript preservation. Nearly 450 ancient manuscripts had been digitised from its collection at the beginning of the 21st century. During recent renovations, relics were uncovered, including the remains of the martyred Bishop Karpos and a piece of the True Cross embedded in the altar. The monastery was the heart of Syriac religion, culture, and education in seminaries.

=== Modern history ===
During the Assyrian genocide of 1915, the monastery of Mor Gabriel suffered severe losses when Kurdish tribes killed all the monks who lived there and occupied the monastery for four years. In 1919 the monastery was returned to the Syriac Orthodox Church, though the trauma of the events persisted in communal memory. A Kurdish family from a nearby village, whose members were directly involved in the massacres of the monastery inhabitants, had settled inside the monastery during this period. They were expelled in 1922 after a siege by the Assyrians, and in 1925 a new bishop was appointed. In 1936, under the new Republic of Turkey, the monastery was officially registered as a religious foundation.

The monastery continued to face ongoing persecution long after the establishment of the Turkish Republic. In the late 1960s, a new wave of attacks and harassment by local Kurds began. The Assyrians filed numerous lawsuits in an attempt to mitigate the violence but later withdrew them when they realised that the attacks had behind-the-scenes support from the government. In 1978, the Turkish government attempted to close the monastery on accusations of sheltering members of ASALA, an Armenian militant group. Only protests from diaspora Assyrians prevented its closure. In the 1980s, similar accusations arose, this time alleging shelter for PKK militants. In 1997, the local governor ordered the closure of the monastery's school, claiming that religious education for Assyrians was illegal because the Syriac Orthodox were not recognised as a protected minority under the Treaty of Lausanne, unlike Armenians, Greeks, and Jews.

Legal pressures have continued into the 21st century. In 2010, the monastery faced five separate lawsuits contesting its right to retain land it had occupied for over a millennium. Church leaders attributed these disputes to bureaucratic stonewalling, while some of the claims came from neighboring Kurdish villages dominated by the Celebi tribe, which had participated in the genocides of 1915. Members of the tribe later provided recruits for the state-run "village guard" militia, which fought against PKK rebels.

From 1962 to 1971, the monastery underwent extensive renovation. A new road allowed vehicles access, a generator was installed to provide electricity, and a seminary for the formation of clergy was opened. Since 1971, the abbot has been Mor Timotheos Samuel Aktas, who has overseen major building projects. Today, the monastery has electricity, running water, and telephone connections, serving as a living centre of monasticism in Tur Abdin.

Despite the relocation of the Syriac Orthodox Patriarchate to Damascus, the monastery remains the centre of Syriac religious education and is regarded by the community as the cultural and linguistic heart of Syriac heritage. It is sometimes described as the "second Jerusalem" of the Syriac Orthodox. The monastery continues its centuries-old role in preserving the Syriac language, culture, and liturgy. Currently, it is inhabited by Mor Timotheos Samuel Aktash, three monks, eleven nuns, and thirty-five boys receiving education in the monastery's teachings, including the Syriac language.

== Monastery architecture ==
The Monastery of Mor Gabriel is composed of two main parts, the lower historic section and the upper annexes constructed in the last century. Within the complex are several significant structures, including the House of Saints (Beth Qadishe), a burial chamber; the Church of the Mother of God; the House of Martyrs in the lowest part of the burial chamber; the House of the Apostles, a prayer hall; the Temple of the Forty Martyrs, a small chapel; the main church, completed under Emperor Anastasius I; and the Dome of Theodora.

=== Main church ===
The main church of the monastery, also known as the Anastasius Church, was begun in 397 by the founders, Mor Samuel and Mor Simon, as a modest house of prayer, and completed in 512 with the patronage of the Byzantine Emperor Anastasius I. Architecturally, the church is a barrel-vaulted structure oriented along a north–south axis. It is notable for its transverse style of construction, a departure from the more typical longitudinal basilica design, as well as for its mosaics. These mosaics are aniconic, containing no human or animal figures. Where the mosaics have been lost, the missing areas are covered with white mortar.

Also known as the Anasthasian church was begun in 397 by the founders of the monastery of Mor Samuel and Mor Simon(Mor Gabriel monastery) as a simple house of prayer and completed with the support of the Byzantine Emperor Anasthasius I in 512. The main church is a barrel-vaulted church with a north–south accent, also the church is well known for its transverse style of architecture and the mosaics in the sanctuary of the main church. the Mosaics are aniconic which means that there is no human or animal in the mosaics. The missing parts of the mosaic are covered with white mortar. The mosaics in Saint Catherine's Monastery on Mount Sinai and those in Mor Gabriel are the only surviving 6th-century Byzantine mosaics located to the east of Constantinople.

=== Dome of Theodora ===
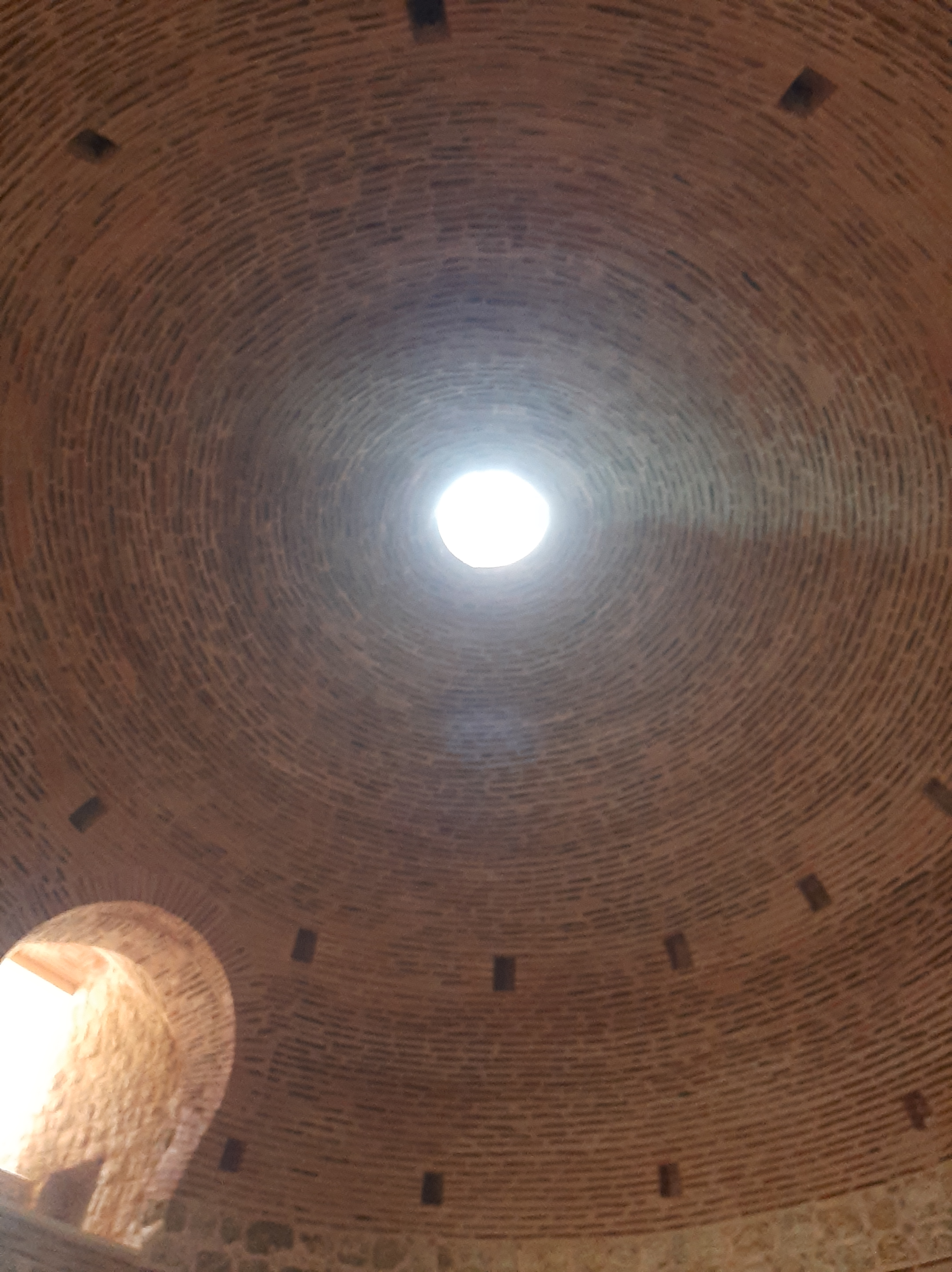
Dome of Theodora

The Dome of Theodora, constructed in the early 6th century, rises to 17 metres and is composed of radially layered bricks supported by ashlar masonry and a mortar core. The dome is traditionally associated with Empress Theodora (497–548), wife of Emperor Justinian I, who was a Miaphysite and a supporter of the non-Chalcedonians. Records indicate that she visited the monastery of Qartmin and donated funds for the construction of the dome, despite Justinian's imperial policy favoring Chalcedon. The building, located at the northwestern corner of the main church, is thought originally to have functioned as a baptistery.

Its structure contains eight arches, a feature laden with symbolic meaning in Christian architecture. Ambrose of Milan wrote "the number eight contains the integrity of rebirth", as the number eight was a symbol of eternity and of the Resurrection.

=== Virgin Mary Church ===
The Church of the Virgin Mary was originally built in the 5th century, though it was destroyed and looted several times throughout its history. The church is reached by passing through a long abbara (vaulted passage) in front of the Dome of Theodora. Its design consists of three arches and three barrel-vaulted naves. The present altar was rebuilt in 1991. An inscription over the entrance records the visit of Patriarch Ignatius Yaqub III in 1965. At times when the greater church was closed, services were conducted in this smaller church.

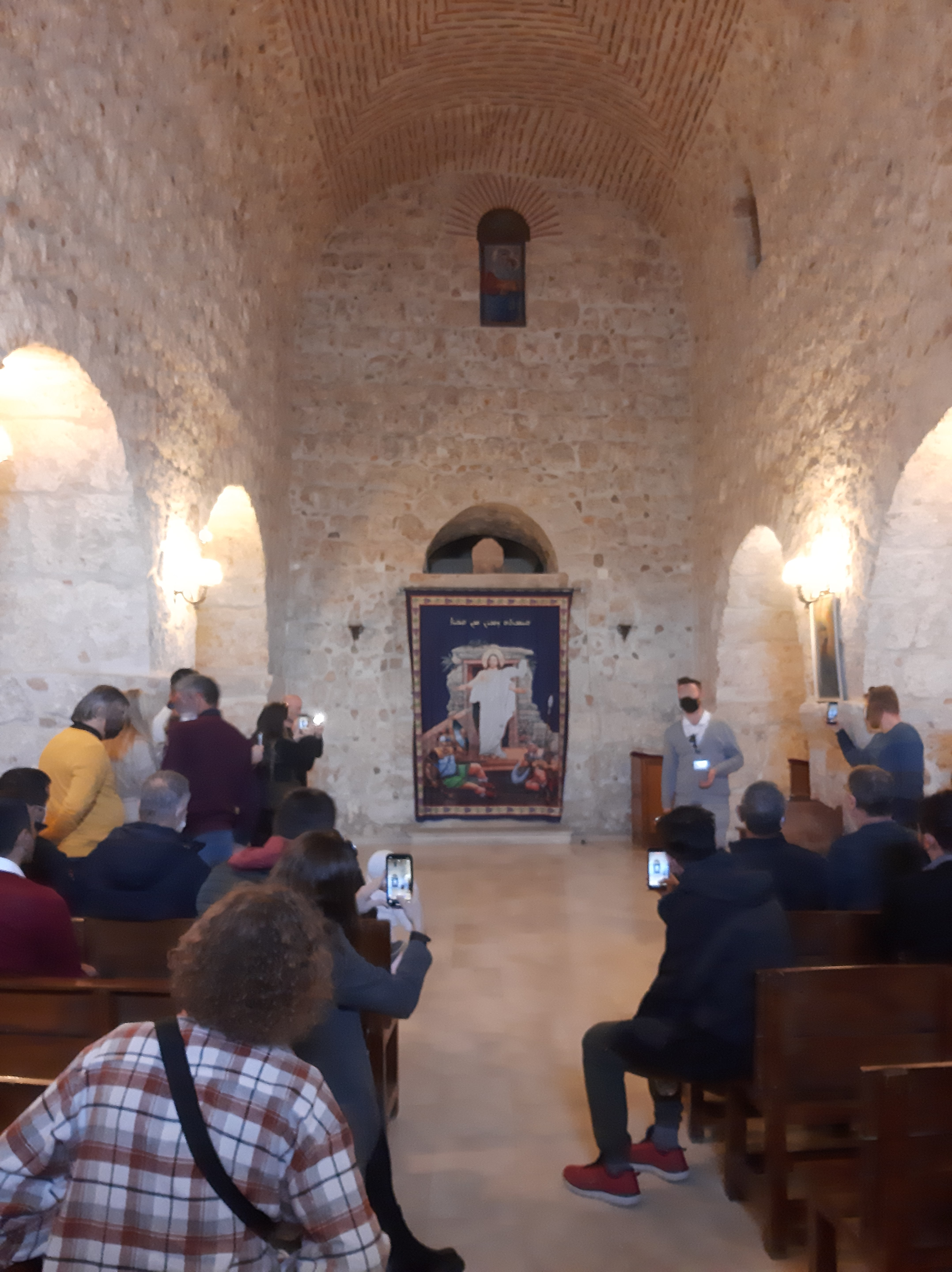
Virgin Mary Church

=== Beth Qadisheh ===
Beth Qadisheh (Syriac: ܒܝܬ ܩܕܝܫܗ, lit. 'House of Saints') serves as the monastery's burial chamber. Originally known as the House of Martyrs, it was first used for the interment of Christians martyred in the early centuries of the faith in the region, when Assyrians were adopting Christianity. Over time, it became the burial place of metropolitans, abbots, and priests. The tomb of St. Gabriel himself is located here.

The clergy were buried in a seated position, facing east, in anticipation of the Resurrection, which was believed to come from the east. The tombs are barrel-roofed, made of marble, with one side left open. Tradition holds that as many as 12,000 relics of saints and martyrs are preserved in this chamber.

== Legal disputes ==
In modern times, Mor Gabriel Monastery became the centre of a decades-long legal struggle over its very right to exist. The dispute, instigated largely by local Kurdish villagers in the surrounding area, revolved around the monastery's land and property rights. In 2008, one villager filed a complaint to the Midyat prosecutor accusing the bishop of being 'engaged in illegal religious and reactionary missionary activities', invoking the words of Mehmed the Conqueror: "cut off the head of anybody who cuts down even a branch from my forest." The complaint targeted forested land near the monastery, which the villagers claimed did not belong to it. Soon after, state surveyors — using old maps and aerial photographs — were dispatched to redraw boundaries. They declared parts of the monastery's wall illegal and reassigned significant tracts of land to three nearby Muslim villages with whom the monastery had long-standing disputes: Yayvantepe, Çandarlı, and Eğlence. The monastery was established hundreds of years before these villages were founded. Surveyors also redrew village borders, expanding the territory of three Muslim villages with which the monastery had long feuded.

As land registration was being implemented in southeastern Turkey, the monastery reached an agreement with neighboring villages regarding its borders, but it remained in conflict with another village on the northwest border. The Kurds frequently changed the terms of the agreement by increasing the so-called "charity" fee they were supposed to receive from the Assyrians in exchange for the disputed land, which amounted to bribery for being left alone, in addition to the ongoing economic and psychological abuse that local Assyrians had to endure. The monastery soon faced escalating accusations beyond land ownership. Backed by local representatives of the ruling Justice and Development Party (AKP), villagers submitted petitions alleging 'missionary activities', 'illegal education of children under the age of 12', 'sheltering unidentified people', and even 'attempts to destroy national unity by inciting revolt'. Another reason they gave was that the monastery has 'too much' land for prayer and that land is needed as a meadow for these villages. These claims echoed older tropes of anti-Christian hostility, but prosecutors chose to pursue only the charge relating to the monastery wall.

Although official records had consistently confirmed the monastery's boundaries since 1938, and reaffirmed them in 1950, the cadastral officers succumbed to pressure from surrounding villages and moved the border. Villagers and Kurdish headmen disputed the monastery's ownership, even though the monks produced a signed 1937 agreement supporting their claim. Despite paying taxes on its property for 70 years, the monastery found its claims dismissed by local courts.

In 2008, cadastral officers visited the land, and Kurdish men and children from nearby villages gathered with axes and knives to cut down trees on the disputed property. Witnesses from the villages arrived, with one side claiming that the monastery wall marked the border between their village and the monastery (Keferbe), while the Kurdish headman of Keferbe argued that the border was 5 kilometres away from the wall. Despite representatives from the monastery presenting a signed 1937 agreement from the villages supporting their claim, the cadastral officers registered the border 2 kilometres away from the wall. The Assyrians contested this decision in local courts, but their appeal was quickly rejected. The charges against the monastery spread panic in the Assyrian diaspora, prompting activists to launch the "Action Mor Gabriel" movement across European cities to highlight the plight of Assyrians in Turkey.

The ultimate goal of the "Action Mor Gabriel" movement was not only to challenge the feudal system of the Kurdish aghas that the Assyrians had to endure, but also to enhance their rights in Turkey by being recognised as equal citizens with full agency and as a minority with special rights under the Lausanne Treaty. While the Lausanne Treaty would eventually come to include the Syriac/Assyrian people, they still do not enjoy full agency regarding their Turkish citizenship to this day. Archbishop Samuel Aktas toured several local Assyrian villages urging residents to maintain peaceful relations with their Muslim neighbours to avoid further tensions.

By 2009, the case had moved from local courts to municipal courts, and ultimately to the Turkish Supreme Court. At one point, the court ruled in favour of the villages, claiming the monastery land was state forest, and even claiming that the sanctuary was built over the ruins of a mosque — despite the fact that Mor Gabriel was founded in 397, nearly two centuries before the birth of Muhammad.

The dispute, however, took on broader significance as Assyrians began to rebuild their homes in Tur Abdin after decades of diaspora caused by the Assyrian genocide of 1915. Assyrians have been returning to their homeland in southeastern Turkey from the diaspora, particularly to the Tur Abdin region, which includes the Mor Gabriel monastery. Kafro, a village bordering the monastery, had no Assyrian residents in 1994, but by 2023 it housed around 50 families who left established lives in Europe to resettle in this underdeveloped area of Turkey. Several hundred Assyrians returned from exile in Western Europe and resettled in Tur Abdin, primarily around the Mor Gabriel monastery. The return migration further inflamed the current conflict, as while returnees spent decades trying to reclaim their abandoned homes and land, neighbouring Kurdish villagers had been grazing their livestock on those properties in the meantime.

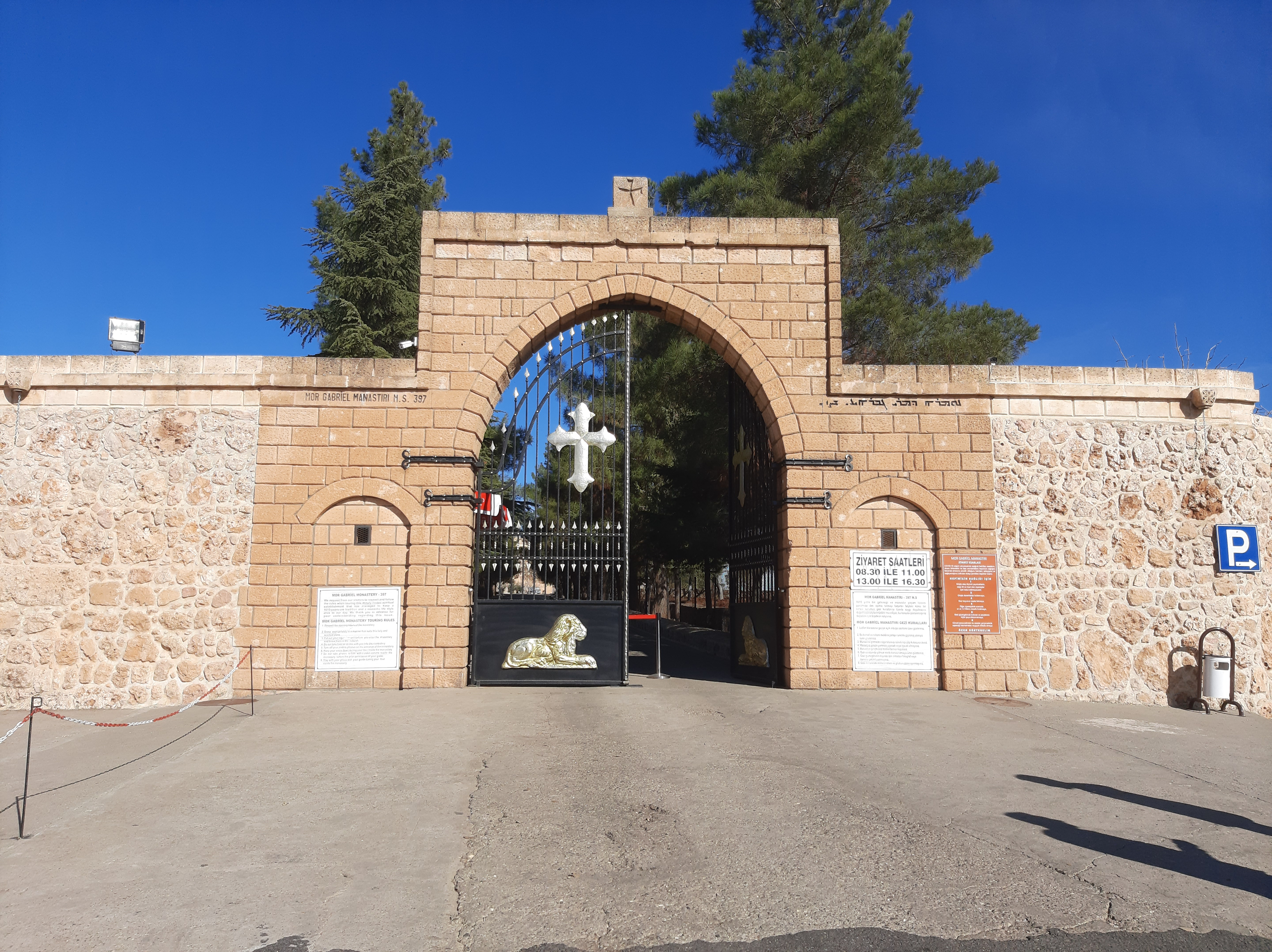
The monastery and its inhabitants continue to face a difficult situation in the turbulent region

Conversely, the growing Assyrian presence in Europe gave the monastery's defenders international visibility, and politicians from Germany and Sweden publicly visited the site in solidarity. Assyrians aim to use the organisational capacity developed during decades in Europe, along with their educational and cultural experiences, to improve living conditions for Assyrians in their homeland and to strengthen prospects for future generations in the event of further return migration. Kurdish villagers reacted with hostility, accusing the monks of 'secret gatherings' and 'illegal activities', and Ankara's leadership grew uneasy with the increased diaspora activism around the recognition of the 1915 massacres as genocide. Then-Prime Minister Recep Tayyip Erdoğan and President Abdullah Gül, after meeting with Syriac representatives, criticised the diaspora for about the issue and hinted at continued altercations if genocide-recognition efforts do not stop: "Your community abroad is talking," they complained to Mor Aktas. The British government, through its embassy in Ankara, has been monitoring the issue after it was raised by Assyrian organisations.

Erol Dora, the first Syriac Orthodox member of the Turkish parliament, was elected in Mardin in 2011 for the Peace and Democracy Party (BDP). A former lawyer for minority foundations, he said: "As the BDP and as the Assyrian people we will do all we can to support the monastery at the international level, because we believe that in this trial we have justice on our side." The monastery eventually took its case to the European Court of Human Rights, transforming the issue from a local property dispute into an internationally discussed minority rights case. This compelled Erdoğan himself to intervene, lest the matter draw further international scrutiny. As part of his 2013 'democratization package', the government announced that the monastery's lands would be restored. In September 2013, the Assembly of Foundations, the top decision-making body of the General Directorate for Foundations, officially approved the return of the confiscated lands. Although the government agreed to return 240,000 square metres of land to the Mor Gabriel monastery, approximately 270,000 square metres remain confiscated.

The Mor Gabriel case has become a symbol of the difficult situation for Assyrians in southeastern Turkey, who are caught between conflicts with Kurdish villages and the government's long history of not recognising Assyrians as a separate minority under the Treaty of Lausanne. While the return of land was a significant win, it also showed the ongoing challenges that the Syriac Orthodox Church and its communities face in their ancestral homeland. Assyrian organisations in Western Europe have raised the issue with relevant political bodies in several countries, including submitting appeals to members of the European Parliament. Meanwhile, Turkey continues to receive more than €500 million for preparatory measures related to EU candidacy, while the Christian Assyrian minority continues to report harassment and distress.

The issues extend beyond the monastery. Assyrians continue to face difficulties with property and land registration. Numerous court cases involving both individuals and religious institutions are ongoing. Similar tactics were used to expropriate other lands — often belonging to Assyrian owners living abroad and thus less able to contest the seizures — by Kurdish municipal authorities with backing from the AKP-controlled government.

== Modern-day significance ==
Mor Gabriel Monastery is the world's oldest continuously active Assyrian monastery and remains the residence and administrative centre of the Tur Abdin Metropolitan Bishop. Long regarded by Assyrians as "the sun of eastern monasteries", it helped give Tur Abdin the epithet "the second Jerusalem" and "the heartbeat of Assyrian Orthodoxy for the region". It serves as a religious and social centre for the remaining Christian Assyrians.

The monastery receives tens of thousands of visitors annually (81,897 in 2013), the vast majority non‑local given there were only about 4,000 Assyrians in Mardin that year. It serves as both a religious and social hub for the remaining Christian Assyrians and has been described as a "talisman for Assyrian Christians worldwide". Annual celebrations are held in honour of St. Gabriel. Pilgrims — many Syriac Orthodox — come to venerate St. Gabriel's relics and visit saints' tombs; a miracle is traditionally attributed to St. Gabriel in which three people were raised from the dead. Muslims and Yazidis also visit seeking cures for illnesses or problems.

Life at Mor Gabriel has preserved a remarkable continuity. The monastery is described as "where for over a millennium and a half life has barely changed except that the bishop's secretary now types on a laptop". Visitors are often permitted to stay overnight; accommodation may consist of a simple camp bed on the terrace in summer, with a basic meal in the evening. The heavy steel gates of the fortress-like monastery are locked at sunset and only opened at dawn, except in life-or-death emergencies. At dawn, visitors are invited to attend the liturgy celebrated in the underground church beneath the belfry. The monastery welcomes visitors from 09:00 to 11:30 in the morning and from 13:00 to 16:30 in the afternoon, where it closes at 16:00 in winter.

== Gallery ==
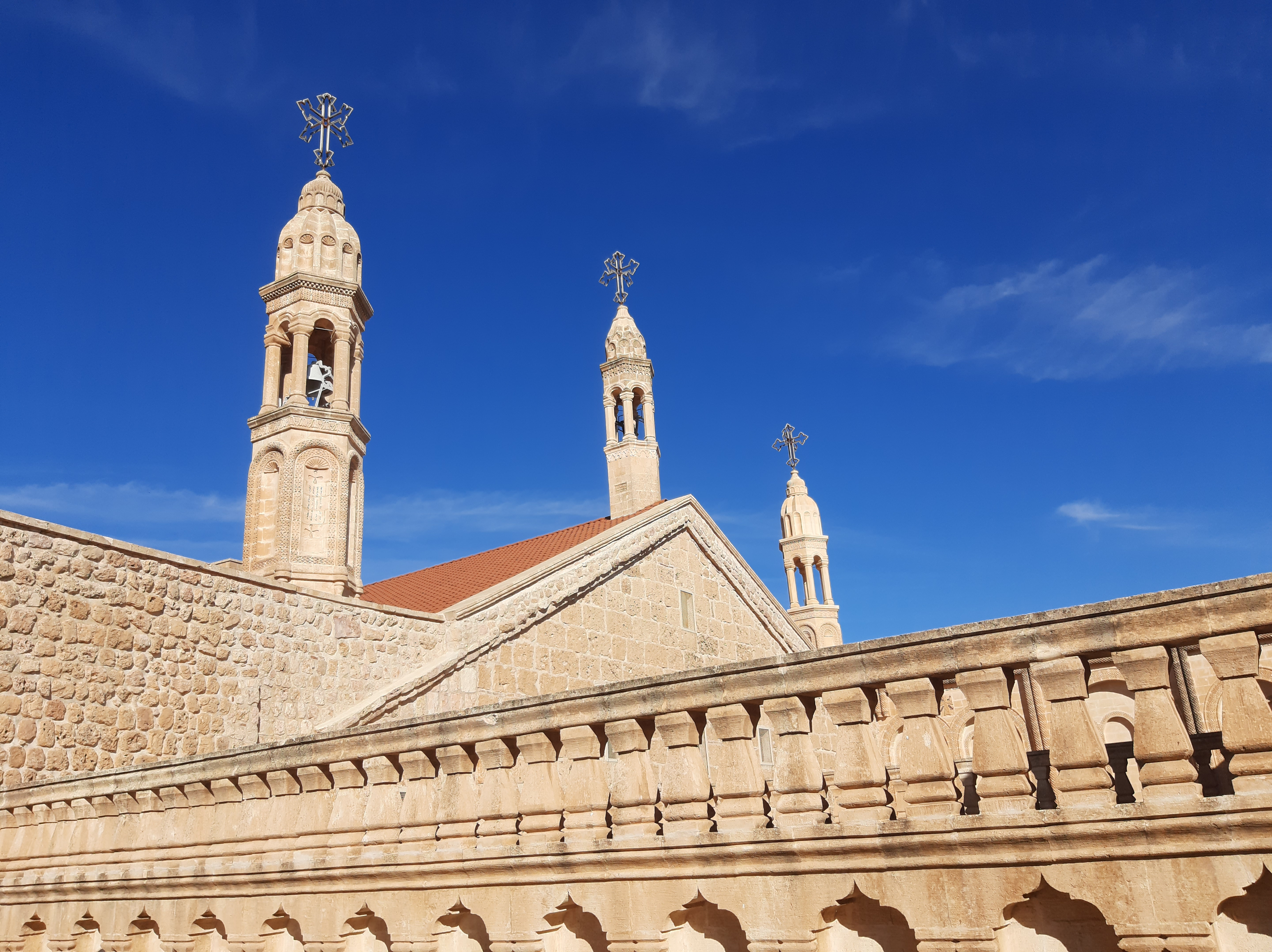
Towers of the monastery near Midyat

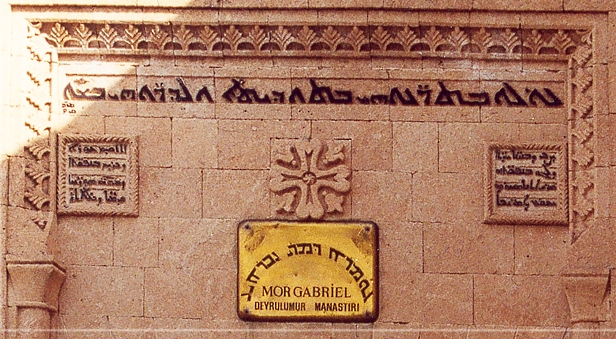
Portal inscription

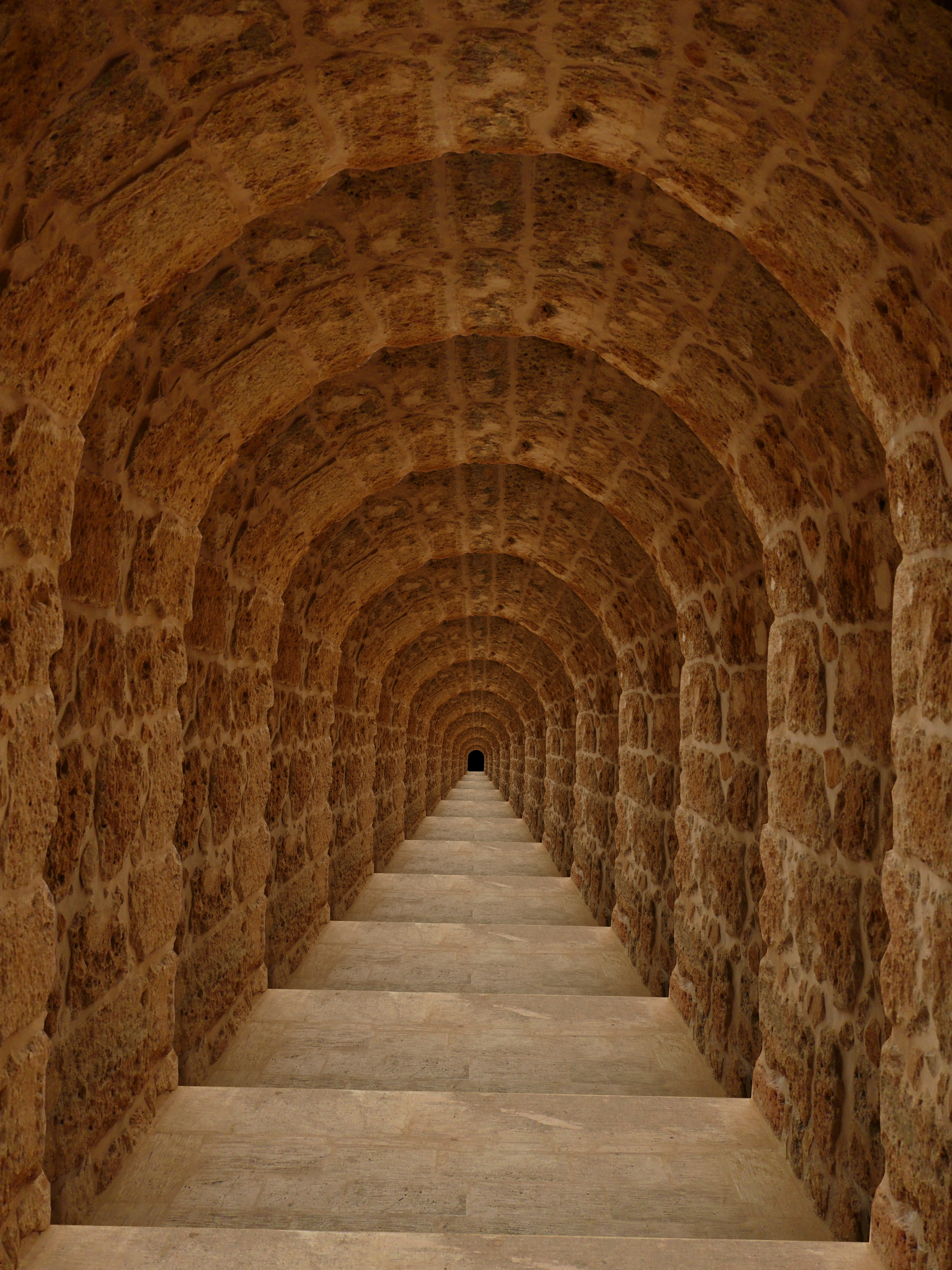
Staircase within the monastery with a Droste effect

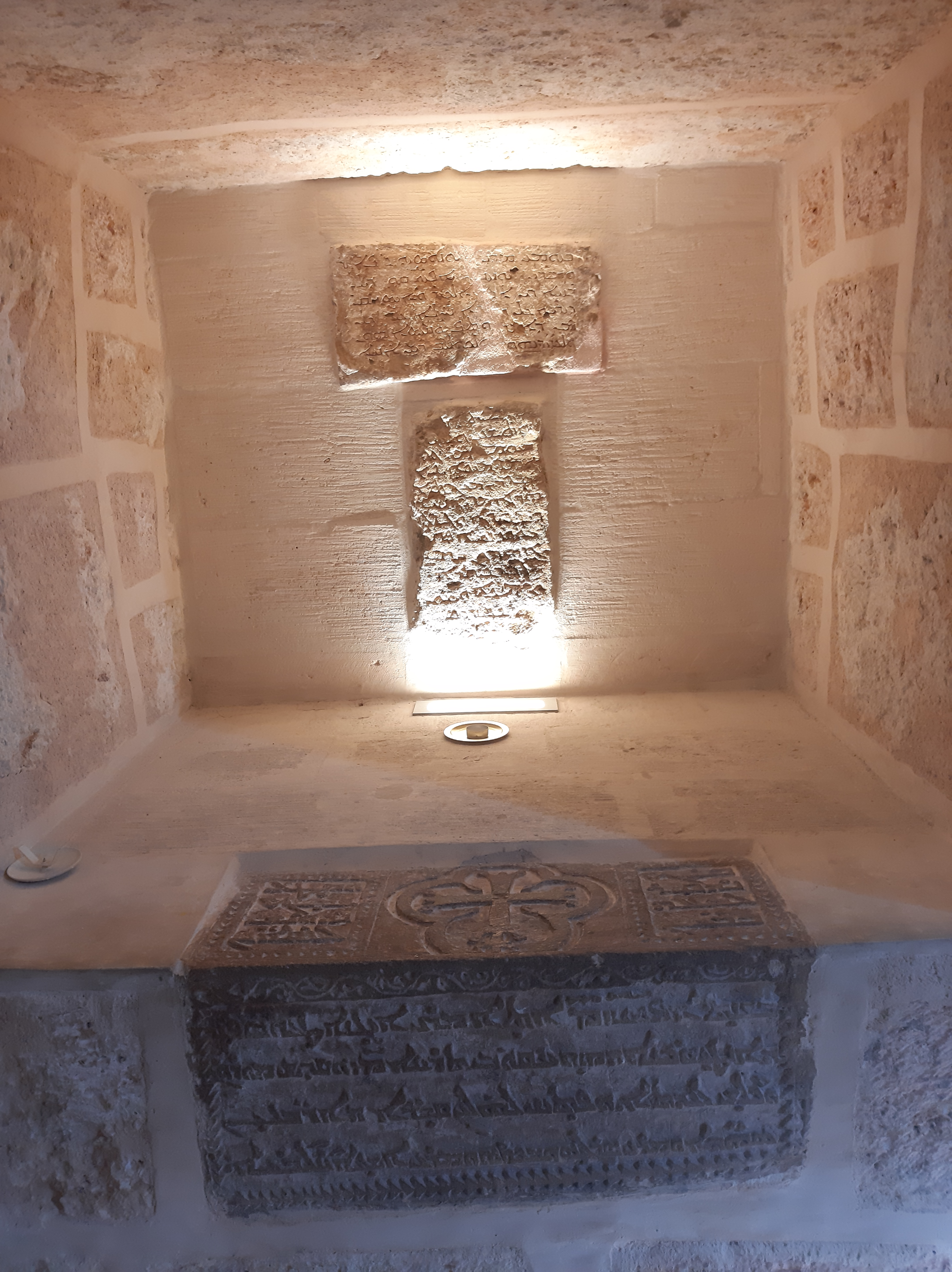
Interior of the Mor Gabriel Monastery

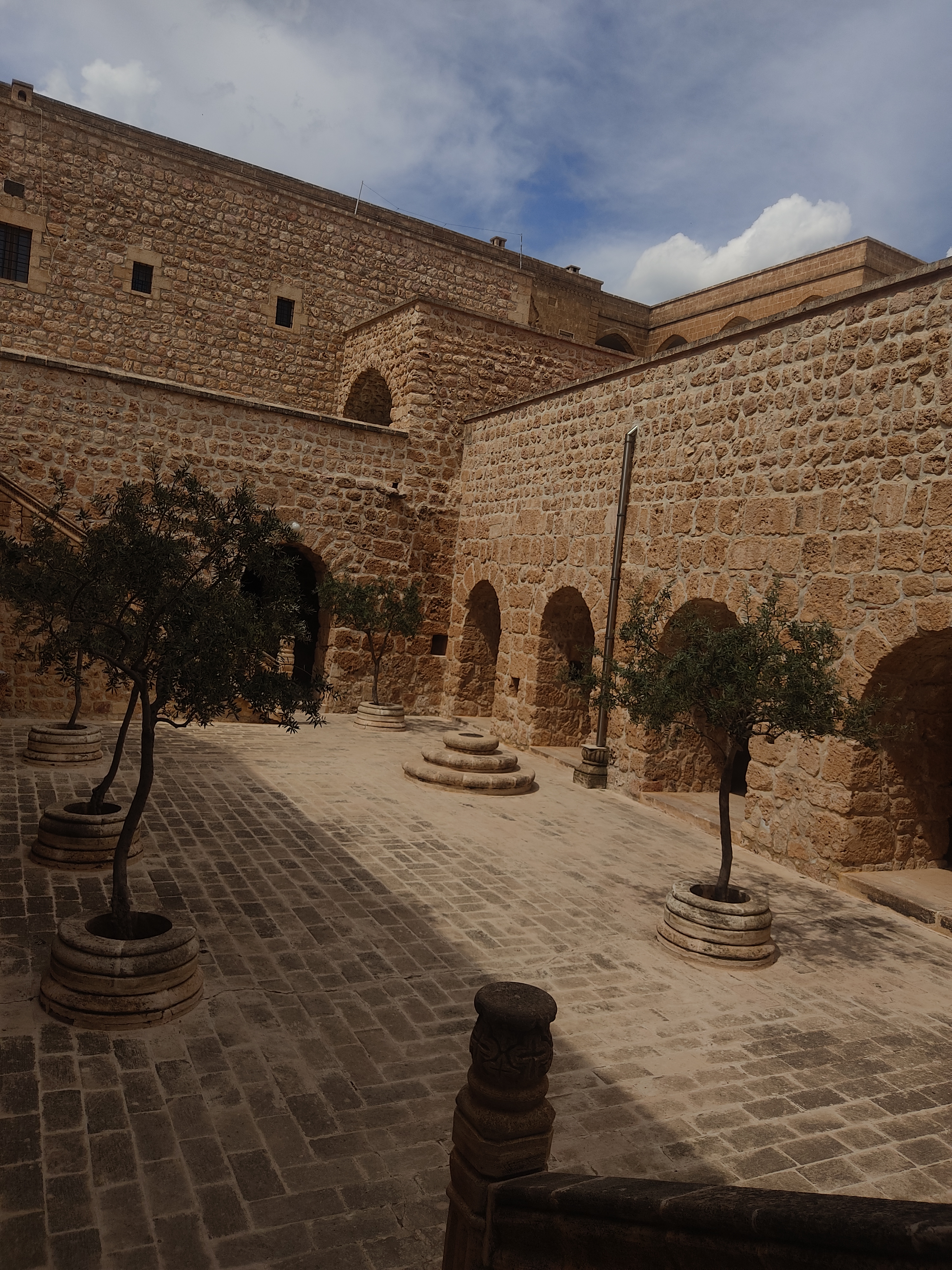
Yard of the monastery

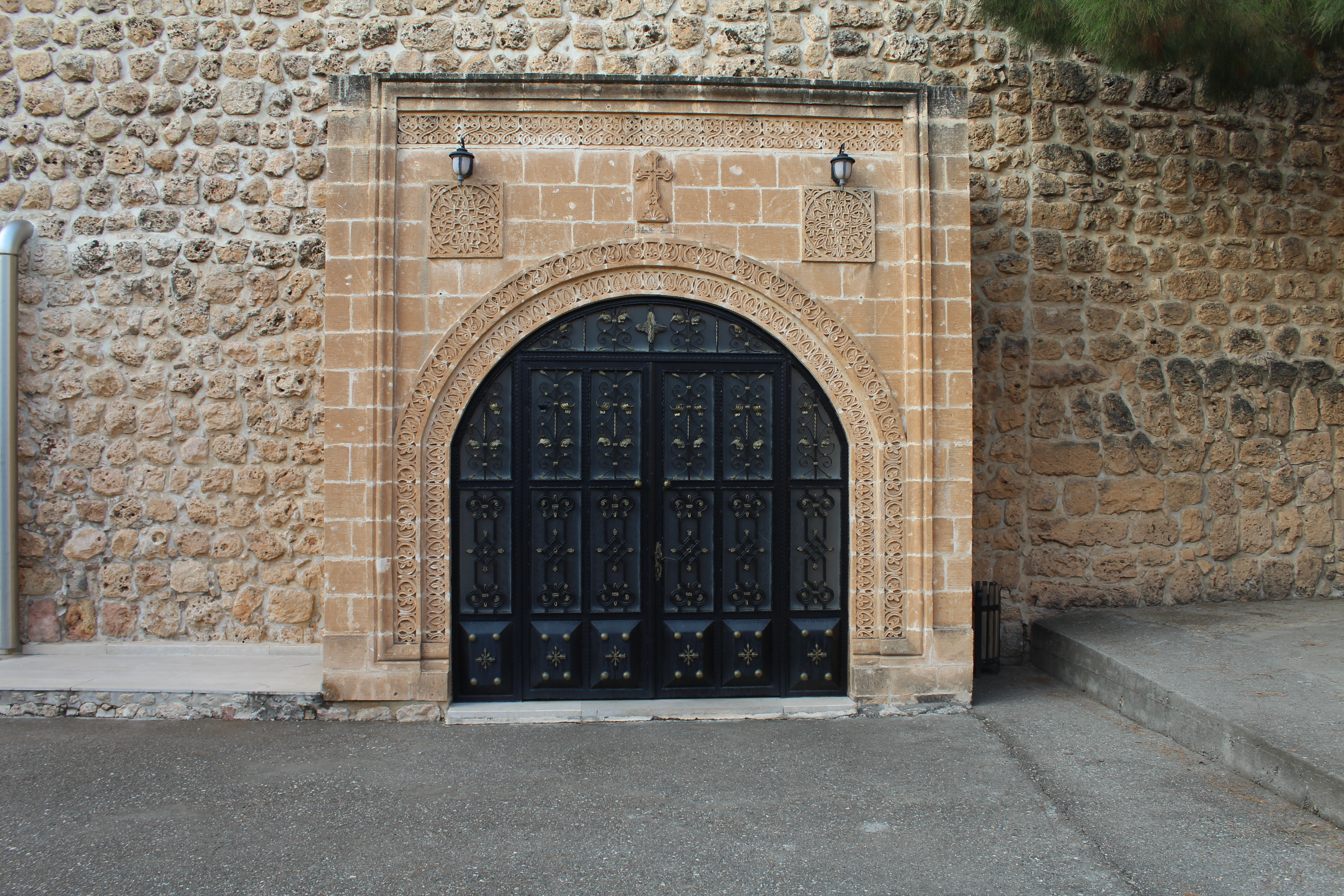
Large metal gate at the entrance

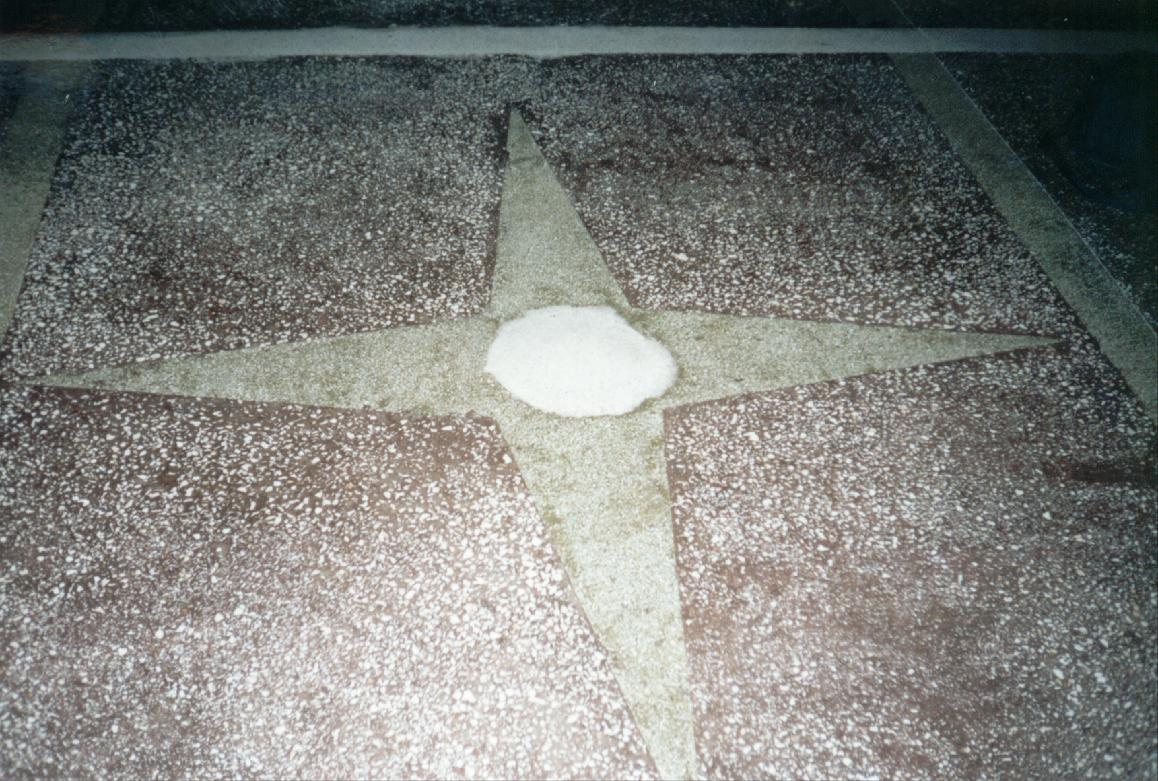
A star of Shamash on the floor of a large hall

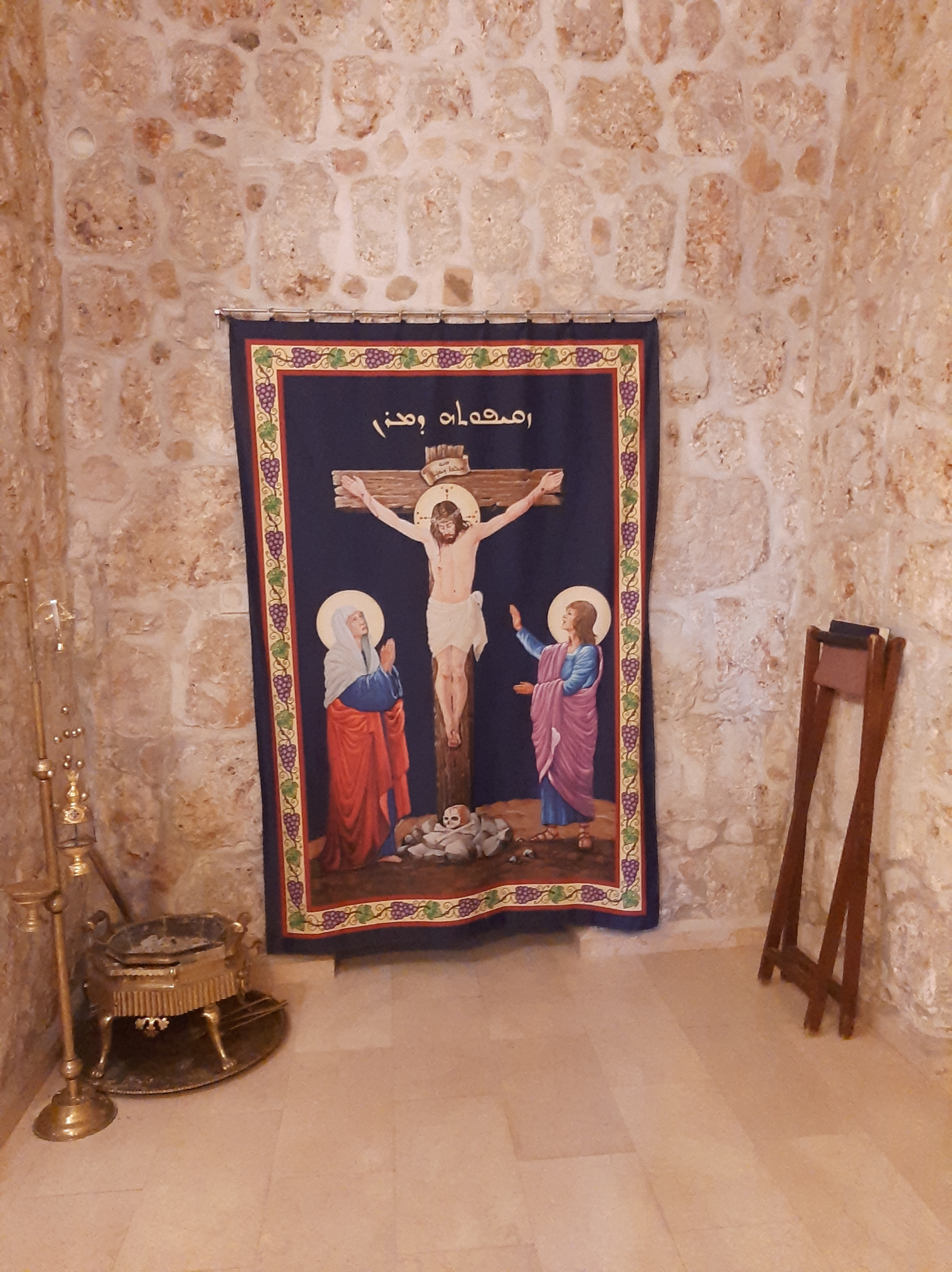
In the Virgin Mary Church

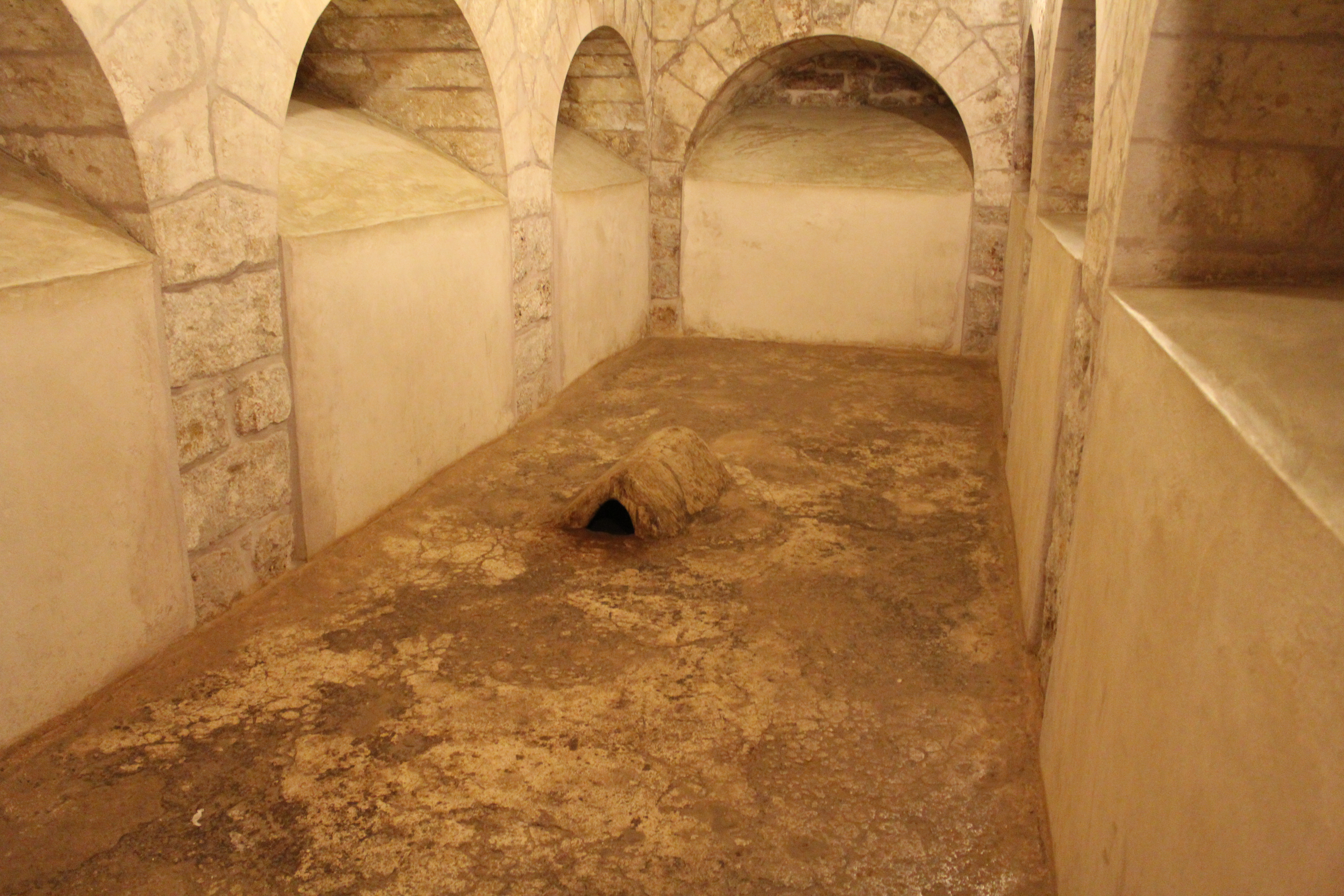
Graveyard on the monastery's grounds

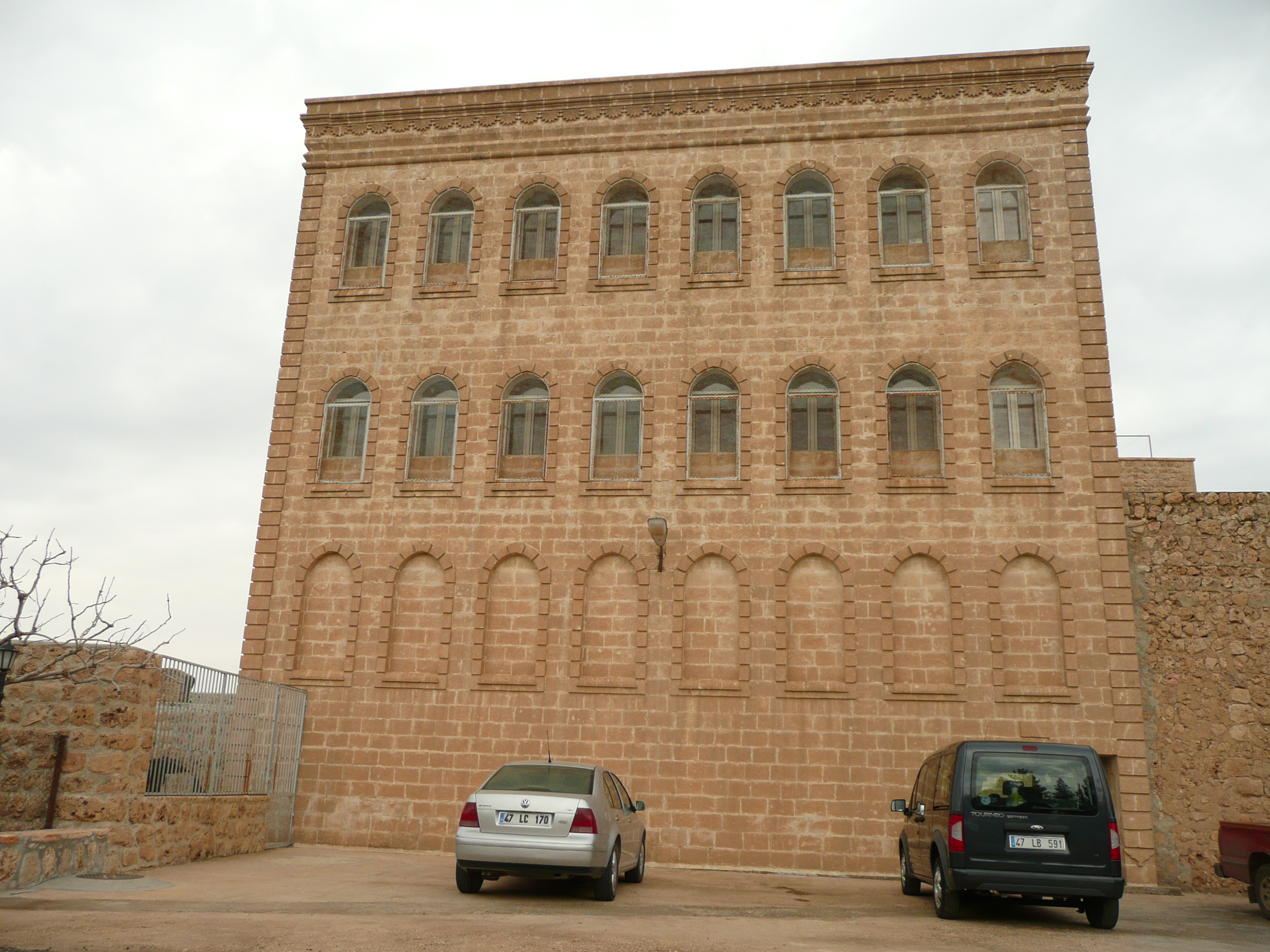
Monks' cells

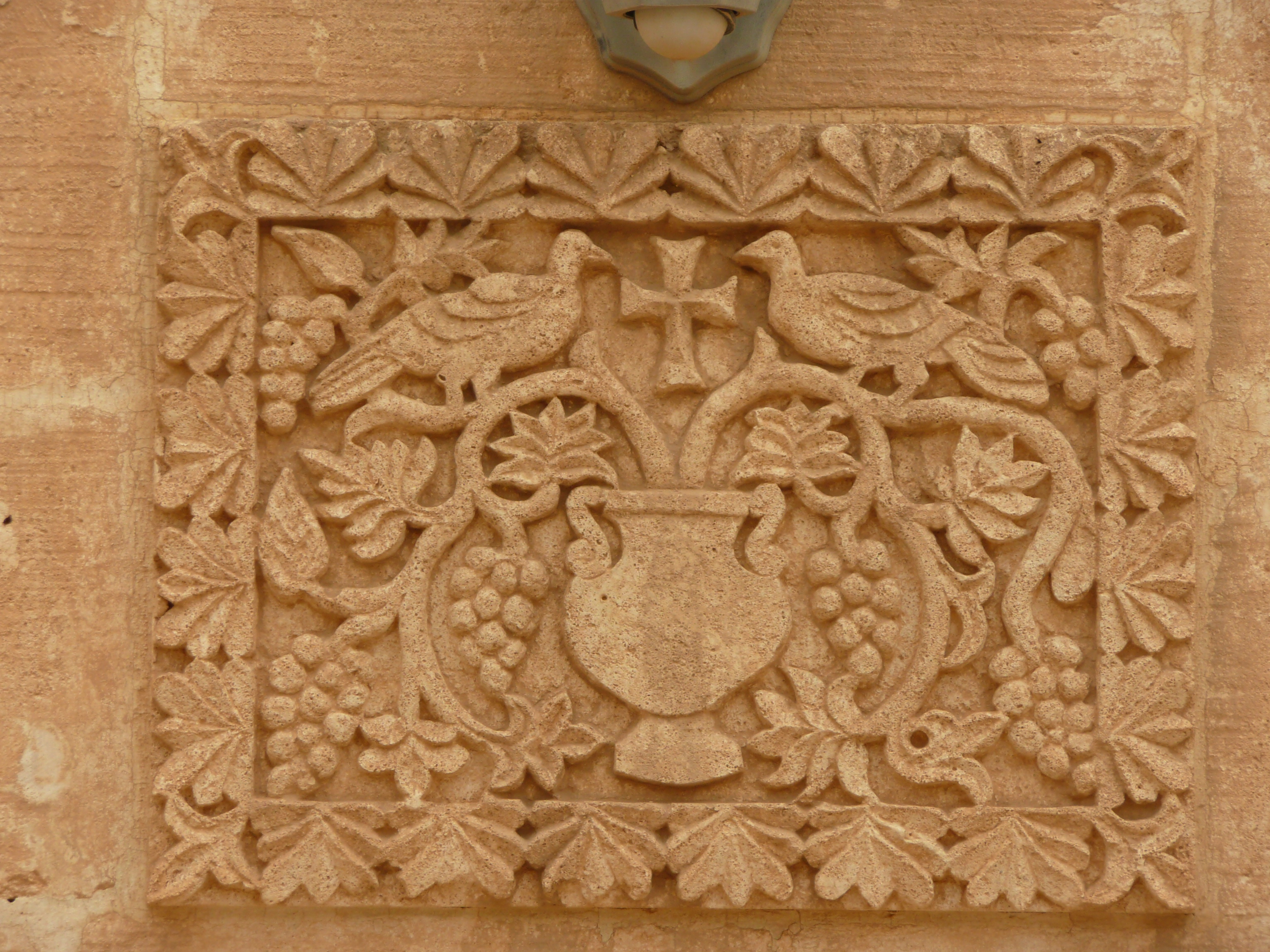
Grape vines are common in Syriac art, representing the blood of Christ and His passion

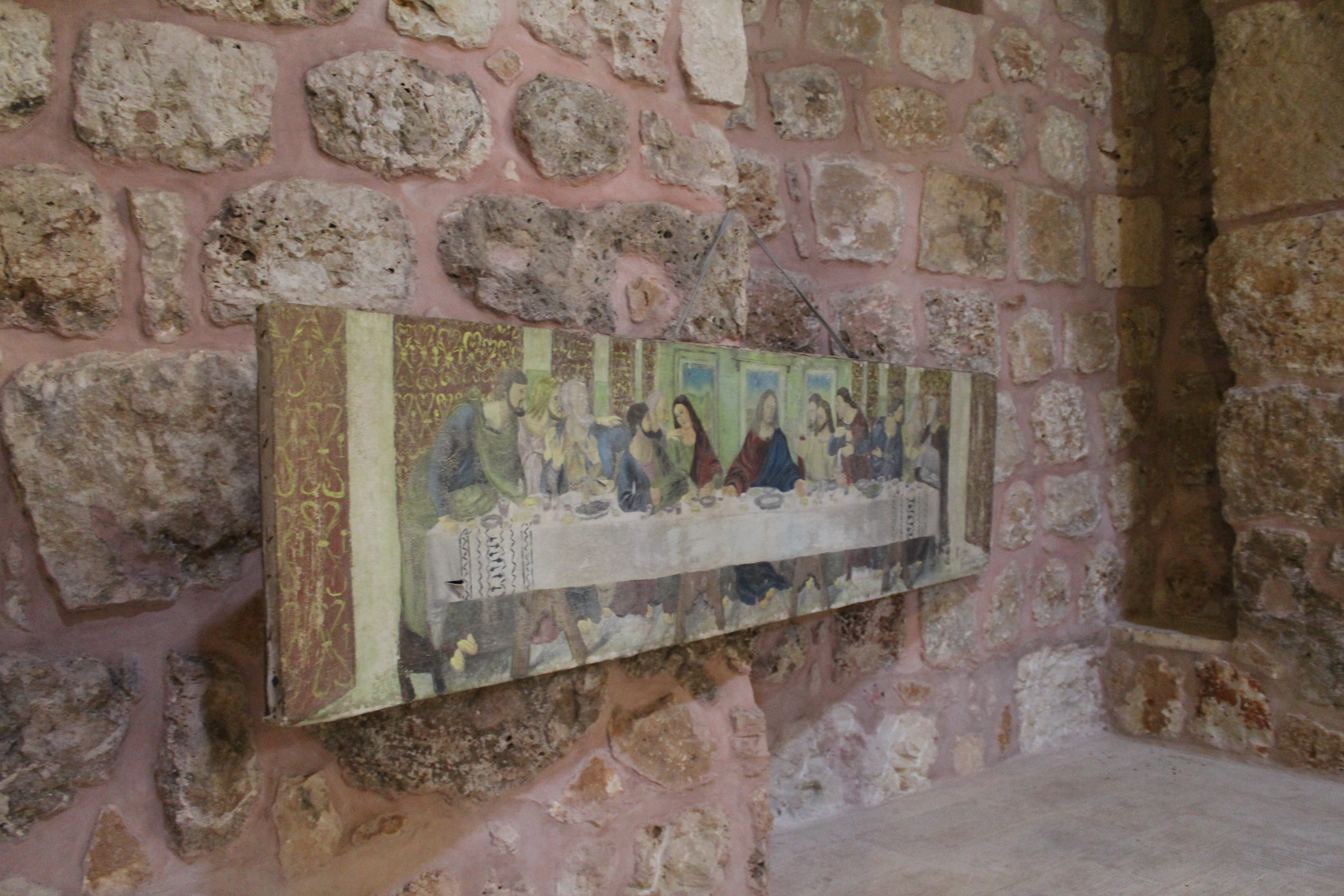
The Last Supper replica

== See also ==
- Oldest churches in the world
- Mor Hananyo Monastery
- Mount Izla
- Anti-Assyrian sentiment
- List of Syriac writers
- Christology

== Sources ==
- Barsoum, Aphrem (2008). Moosa, Matti (trsl.) (ed.). The History of Tur Abdin. Gorgias Press. ISBN 978-1-59333-715-5.
- Üngör, Uğur Ümit (2011). The Making of Modern Turkey: Nation and State in Eastern Anatolia, 1913–1950. Oxford University Press. ISBN 978-0-19-965522-9.
