= Gabriel of Beth Qustan =

Syriac Orthodox bishop

Saint Gabriel of Beth Qustan
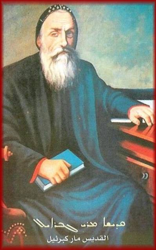

Bishop of Tur Abdin
- Born: circa 573–574; Beth Qustan, Eastern Roman Empire
- Died: December 23, 648
- Venerated in: Oriental Orthodox Churches
- Major shrine: Monastery of Saint Gabriel, Turkey
- Feast: 23 December

Saint Gabriel of Beth Qustan (Syriac: ܡܪܝ ܓܒܪܐܝܠ: Mor Gabriel), also known as Saint Gabriel of Qartmin, was the Bishop of Tur Abdin until his death in 648. He is venerated as a saint in the Oriental Orthodox Churches and his feast day is 23 December.

== Biography ==
Gabriel was born in the village of Beth Qustan circa 573–574, and became a monk at the Monastery of Qartmin circa 588–589. Circa 593–594, he was ordained a deacon, and, circa 612–613, Gabriel was elected head of the brothers at the monastery. He was ordained a priest circa 618–619, and became Abbot of the Monastery of Qartmin and Archbishop of Dara on 1 May 634. Gabriel succeeded Daniel Uzoyo as abbot and bishop.

Following the Muslim Conquest of Mesopotamia in 639, Gabriel likely negotiated the rights and obligations of the Syriac Orthodox Church in Tur Abdin with the Muslim conquerors. He may also have met with the Caliph Umar. Several miracles are attributed to Gabriel during his time as bishop, including the resurrection of the son of a widow in the village of Sighun, a boy from the village of Olin, and his friend the abbot of the Monastery of the Cross near Hah.

According to his hagiography, at the age of 70, Gabriel sent men to transport a large stone at Beth Debe to the Monastery of Qartmin, however, they were forced to abandon the stone due to its size. Gabriel ordered the people in the monastery to help transport the stone, at which the dead rose to help. The stone was moved to the Dome of Theodora at the monastery and Gabriel begged the dead for their forgiveness.

After 644, Gabriel became the Bishop of Tur Abdin with authority equal to an archbishop, and he later died on 23 December 648. Gabriel's funeral was attended by 2700 priests and altar boys, and the bishops Iwannis of Amida, Ignatius of Mayperqat, Gregory of Arzon, Basil of Jazira, Polycarp of Beth Araboye, Dioscorus of Singara and Haburo, Epiphanius of Nisibis, Sisinnius of Dara, John of Kfar Tutho, and Jacob of Sawro. A 10-year-old boy died at the funeral, but was resurrected soon after (this young boy was later identified with Simeon of the Olives).

A plague in 774 led the monks of the Monastery of Qartmin to exhume Gabriel's remains to help ward off the plague. Gabriel's right hand was removed and taken to Hah, and his body was reburied in a bronze coffin. Gabriel later became the patron saint of the Monastery of Qartmin, and, by the end of the fifteenth century, the monastery became known as the Monastery of Saint Gabriel.

== Bibliography ==
- Johnson, Dale A. (2008). Tracts on the Mountain of the Servants. Lulu.com. ISBN 9781435739918.
- Palmer, Andrew (1990). Monk and Mason on the Tigris Frontier: The Early History of Tur 'Abdin. Cambridge University Press. ISBN 9780521360265.
