= Pierre =

French male given name

- Pronunciation: French: [pjɛʁ]
- Gender: Masculine
- Language: French

Origin
- Meaning: "Stone"
- Region of origin: France

Other names
- Related names: Peter; Petter; Pjetër; Pater; Pete; Petey/Petie; Peoter; Pearce; Petero; Per; Peta; Petra; Pedro; Pier; Piers; Pieter; Pietro; Peadar; Pere; Kepa; Peru; Peio; Boutros; Peterson

Pierre is a masculine given name. It is a French form of the name Peter. Pierre originally meant "rock" or "stone" in French (derived from the Greek word πέτρος (petros) meaning "stone, rock", via Latin "petra"). It is a translation of Aramaic כיפא (Kefa), the nickname Jesus gave to apostle Simon Bar-Jona, referred in English as Saint Peter. Pierre is also found as a surname.

As a nickname, "Pierre" can be shortened to "Pierrot" ('Little Pierre'; name of a famous pantomime character) or "Pier" ('Pete').

== People with the given name ==
- Monsieur Pierre, Pierre Jean Philippe Zurcher-Margolle (c. 1890–1963), French ballroom dancer and dance teacher
- Pierre (footballer, born 1982), Lucas Pierre Santos Oliveira, Brazilian footballer
- Pierre (footballer, born 2002), Pierre Wagner Oliveira dos Santos, Brazilian footballer
- Pierre, Baron of Beauvau (c. 1380–1453)
- Pierre, Duke of Penthièvre (1845–1919)
- Pierre, marquis de Fayet (died 1737), French naval commander and Governor General of Saint-Domingue
- Prince Pierre, Duke of Valentinois (1895–1964), father of Rainier III of Monaco
- Pierre Affre (1590–1669), French sculptor
- Pierre Agostini, French physicist
- Pierre Alarie, Canadian ambassador
- Pierre d'Arc, brother of the French heroine Joan of Arc
- Pierre-Emerick Aubameyang (born 1989), professional footballer who plays for the English club Chelsea and the Gabon national football team
- Pierre Audi (1957–2025), French-Lebanese theatre director and artistic director
- Pierre Barbe (1900–2004), French architect
- Pierre Bézier, engineer and mathematician known for his work with Bézier curves
- Pierre Blaise (1955–1975), French film actor
- Pierre Bordier (born 1945), French politician
- Pierre Boulez (1925–2016), French classical and electronic composer
- Pierre Boulle (1912–1994), French author
- Pierre Bourgault, public speaker, journalist and politician famed for his work for Quebec independence from Canada
- Pi'erre Bourne, American record producer, rapper, songwriter, and audio engineer.
- Pierre Bouvier, Canadian musician and lead singer of Simple Plan
- Pierre Brice, French actor
- Pierre Caille (disambiguation), several people
- Pierre Capretz, host of French in Action
- Pierre Cardin, French fashion designer
- Pierre Cathala (1888–1947), French Minister of Finance from 1942 to 1944
- Pierre Céré (born 1959), Quebec activist, writer and politician
- Pierre Chambrin, White House Executive Chef
- Pierre Champoux (born 1963), Canadian ice hockey official
- Pierre Chouteau, Jr., (1789–1865), American fur trader who established the trading post of Fort Pierre (South Dakota) in 1832
- Pierre Clostermann, French pilot who fought in World War II for the Royal Air Force (RAF)
- Pierre Coffin, animator known for the Minions franchise
- Pierre Conner, American mathematician
- Pierre Corneille, (1606–1684) French playwright known for Le Cid
- Pierre Corréia, French rugby union player
- Pierre de Coubertin, founder of the modern Olympic Games
- Pierre Courthion (1902–1988), Swiss art critic and historian
- Pierre Curie, French physicist and husband of Marie Curie
- Pierre Dagher, Lebanese actor and voice actor
- Pierre Darmon (born in 1934), French tennis player
- Pierre Daru (1767–1829), French soldier, statesman, historian, and poet
- Pierre de Fermat, French lawyer and mathematician
- Pierre Deladonchamps, French actor
- Pierre Deland, Swedish actor and director
- Pierre Pelerin de Maricourt, French scholar
- Pierre Deligne, Belgian mathematician
- Pierre Dolbeault, French mathematician
- Pierre Engvall, Swedish ice hockey forward
- Pierre Fischer (born 1995), German politician
- Pierre Fourier, Catholic saint and French priest
- Pierre Franckh, German actor
- Pierre Gagnaire, French chef
- Pierre Gagnier, Canadian politician
- Pierre Garçon, American football player
- Pierre Gasly, racing driver currently driving for Alpine F1 Team in Formula One
- Pierre Gaspard (1834–1915), French mountain climber and guide
- Pierre Gaspard, Belgian physicist and professor
- Pierre Gemayel, politician and founder of the Al-Kataeb party in Lebanon
- Pierre Godin (born 1947), Canadian politician
- Pierre David Guetta, French DJ, record producer and songwriter
- Pierre Harmel (1911–2009), former Belgian Prime Minister
- Pierre Heijboer, Dutch journalist
- Pierre Henry, French musician
- Pierre Hermans, Dutch field hockey goalkeeper
- Pierre-Emile Kordt Højbjerg, Danish professional footballer
- Pierre van Hooijdonk, Dutch footballer
- Pierre Jallow, Gambian basketball player
- Pierre Jeanpierre, French soldier
- Pierre Yves Kéralum (1817–1872), French-American priest and architect
- Pierre Laporte (1921–1970), Canadian journalist, lawyer, and politician
- Pierre Lavertu, Canadian football player
- Pierre Le Faguays (1892–1962), French sculptor
- Pierre Levasseur (disambiguation), several people
- Pierre Littbarski, German footballer
- Pierre van Maldere, South Dutch composer
- Pierre Marchand (editor), French publisher
- Pierre Menard, American fur trader and politician
- Pierre Morel, French film director
- Pierre Moullier (born 2000), English actor
- Pierre Claver Nahimana, Burundian politician
- Pierre Novellie, South African-born comedian and writer
- Pierre Nkurunziza, former president of Burundi
- Pierre Papillaud (1935–2017), French billionaire businessman
- Pierre Pilote, ice hockey player
- Pierre Pincemaille, French musician
- Pierre Poilievre (born 1979), Canadian member of Parliament, leader of the Conservative Party of Canada and the leader of the Official Opposition
- Pierre-Joseph Proudhon, the first self-proclaimed anarchist and is regarded by some as the founder of modern anarchist theory
- Pierre-Loup Rajot, French actor and director
- Pierre-Auguste Renoir, French impressionist artist
- Pierre Reverdy, French poet
- Pierre Roger (swimmer), French swimmer
- Pierre Salinger, Press Secretary to US President John F. Kennedy
- Pierre Sanoussi-Bliss, German actor and director
- Pierre Sauvé (1756 – c. July 1822), French-born American planter and politician
- Pierre Schaeffer, French experimental musician
- Pierre Schapira (mathematician), French mathematician
- Pierre Sergeol (1902–1975), French actor
- Pierre Shammassian, Lebanese-Armenian comedian
- Pierre Sinaÿ, French organic chemist
- Pierre Sokolsky, American physicist
- Pierre Sprey, French-American aircraft designer
- Pierre Strong Jr. (born 1998), American football player
- Pierre Taki, Japanese musician
- Pierre Tardi (1897–1972), French scientist
- Pierre Tendean revolution hero from Indonesia
- Pierre Thomas (disambiguation), several people
- Pierre Trudeau, former Canadian Prime Minister
- Pierre Turgeon, Québécois NHL Hall of Famer
- Pierre Vatin (born 1967), French politician
- Pierre Vogel (born 1978), German Islamist Preacher
- Pierre Warren, American football player

== People with the surname ==
- Aaron Pierre (born 1993), footballer
- Abbé Pierre, Henri Marie Joseph Grouès (1912–2007), French Catholic priest who founded the Emmaus Movement
- Carmine Pierre-Dufour, Canadian film director and screenwriter
- Christophe Pierre (born 1946), Catholic prelate and diplomat
- DBC Pierre (penname), Mexican writer
- Eliott Pierre (born 2001), French para-cyclist
- Georges St-Pierre (born 1981), Canadian MMA fighter and former UFC Welterweight champion
- James Pierre (born 1996), American football player
- Jaron Pierre Jr. (born 2002), American basketball player
- Jean Baptiste Louis Pierre (1833–1905), French botanist
- John Wallace Pierre, American engineer
- Juan Pierre (born 1977), American baseball player
- Percy A. Pierre (born 1939), American electrical engineer and mathematician
- Perri Pierre (born 1988), Haitian-American actor and film producer
- Raymond Pierre (born 1967), American track and field athlete
- Robert Pierre (born 1992), Christian recording artist
- Roger Pierre (1923–2010), French actor
- Rosemonde Pierre-Louis, Haitian-American activist and attorney
- Sydney Pierre, Mauritian politician
- Yhonzae Pierre (born 2005), American football player

== Aliases ==
- Nickname for Trần Văn Nhung (1933–2020), Vietnamese footballer who played for the South Vietnam national team
- Pierre Carl Ouellet, former ring name of Canadian wrestler Carl Ouellet (born 1967)
- Pierre Poutine, an alias used in an attempt to hide certain parties involved in the 2011 Canadian federal election voter suppression scandal

== Fictional characters ==
- Pierre, a Chrono Cross playable character
- Pierre, a character in JumpStart
- Pierre, in the 2016 film A Wedding
- Pierre, a non-playable Mii opponent in the Wii series
- Pierre Bezukhov, a central character in the novel War and Peace by Leo Tolstoy
- Pierre Escargot, a French teacher from the TV show All That, played by Kenan Thompson
- Pierre Belmondo, a Wipeout character responsible for the birth of anti-gravity racing
- Dominique Pierre, in the Netflix series Grand Army
- Pierrot, pantomime and commedia dell'arte character
- Pierre, the bird of France Hetalia

== See also ==
- Pierre (disambiguation)
- French submarine Pierre Chailley
- Pierre-Simon
- Jean-Pierre (given name)
- Lucky Pierre (disambiguation)
- Saint-Pierre (disambiguation)
