= Petrosyan =

- Pronunciation: [pɛtɾɔsˈjɑn]

Origin
- Meaning: "son of Petros"
- Region of origin: Armenia

Petrosyan (Armenian: Պետրոսյան), Petrosian or Petrossian (Eastern Armenian), Bedrosian or Bedrossian (Western Armenian) is a common surname in Armenia. It is a patronymic from the Armenian first name Petros (equivalent to Peter, making the name effectively equivalent to Peterson).

The following people share this surname:

== Petrosyan ==
- Arev Petrosyan (born 1972), Armenian artist
- Arevik Petrosyan (born 1972), Armenian politician and lawyer
- Armen Petrosyan, multiple people
- Armenak Petrosyan (born 1973), Armenian professional footballer
- Arsen Petrosyan (born 1991), Armenian footballer
- Artur Petrosyan (born 1971), Armenian professional footballer
- Artur Petrosyan (journalist) (born 1979), Russian football journalist and scout
- Gagik Petrosyan (born 1973), Armenian politician
- Galust Petrosyan (born 1981), Armenian professional footballer
- Gevorg Petrosyan (politician) (born 1972), Armenian lawyer and politician
- Giorgio Petrosyan (born 1985), Armenian-Italian kickboxer
- Hamlet Petrosyan (born 1955), Armenian historian, archaeologist and anthropologist
- Leon Petrosyan (born 1940), Russian mathematician
- Leonard Petrosyan (1952–1999), Armenian politician; second Nagorno-Karabakh Republic President (March – September 1997)
- Manuel Petrosyan (born 1998), Armenian chess player
- Mariam Petrosyan (born 1969), Armenian painter, cartoonist and novelist
- Mariam Petrosyan (born 1991), Russian-Armenian singer and songwriter
- Nazar Petrosyan (born 1951), Russian football coach and player
- Oleg Petrosyan (born 1977), Russian serial killer
- Petros Petrosyan (1968–2012), Armenian painter
- Rafik Petrosyan (1940–2021), Armenian politician
- Rudik Petrosyan (born 1980), Armenian weightlifter
- Samvel Petrosyan (born 1954), Soviet footballer
- Sergey Petrosyan (1988–2017), Azerbaijani-Russian weightlifter
- Shahen Nikolay Petrosyan (1912–1999), Armenian lawyer and professor
- Shushan Petrosyan (born 1967), Armenian singer and politician
- Sos and Victoria Petrosyan, German quick-change artists
- Valery Petrosyan (born 1942), Armenian-Russian chemist
- Vardan Petrosyan (born 1959), Armenian actor, scriptwriter, and parodist
- Vardges Petrosyan (1932–1994), Armenian writer
- Yevgeny Petrosyan (born 1945), Russian stand-up comedian of Armenian descent

== Petrosian ==
- Adeliia Petrosian (born 2007), Russian figure skater
- Arshak Petrosian (born 1953), Armenian chess grandmaster
- Ashot Petrosian (1930–1998), Soviet Armenian mathematician
- Davit G. Petrosian (born 1984), Armenian chess player
- Georgi Petrosian (born 1953), Armenian politician
- Mahaya Petrosian (born 1970), Iranian actress of Armenian descent
- Manouk Petrosian (1676–1749), Armenian scholar and theologian
- Tigran Petrosian (1929–1984), Soviet-Armenian chess grandmaster and world champion
- Tigran L. Petrosian (born 1984), Armenian chess grandmaster

== Petrossian ==
- Petrossian (business), French international enterprise in trade of caviar and wide range of products
  - Armen Petrossian, French-Armenian businessman and director of Petrossian enterprise
  - Melkoum Petrossian, French-Armenian business, co-founder of Petrossian enterprise
  - Mouchegh Petrossian, French-Armenian business, co-founder of Petrossian enterprise
- Konstantin Petrossian (born 1946), Soviet-Armenian composer, pianist and conductor
- Marine Petrossian (born 1960), Armenian poet, essayist and columnist
- Michel Petrossian (born 1973), French-Armenian composer
- Tony Petrossian, Iranian commercial and music video director

== Ter-Petrosyan / Ter-Petrossian ==
- Arpine Mikaeli Ter-Petrosyan (born 1990), Armenian singer, songwriter, musician and record producer
- Hakob Ter-Petrosyan (born 1971), Armenian footballer
- Levon Ter-Petrosyan (born 1945), Armenian politician; first Armenian President (1991–1998)
- Lyudmila Ter-Petrosyan (born 1948), Russian-Armenian politician
- Marine Petrossian (born 1960), Armenian poet, essayist and journalist
- Semeno Ter-Petrosian (1882–1922), Bolshevik revolutionary known as Kamo

== Pedrossian ==
- Maria Aparecida Pedrossian (1934–2022), Brazilian politician
- Pedro Pedrossian (1928–2017), Brazilian politician, Governor of Mato Grosso do Sul (1980–1983 and 1991–1994)

== Bedrosian ==
- Bedros Bedrosian (born 1955), Romanian triple jumper
- Cam Bedrosian (born 1991), American baseball player
- Haiganush R. Bedrosian (born 1943), American judge
- Shosh Bedrosian, American and Israeli journalist
- Steve Bedrosian (born 1957), American former Major League Baseball player

== Bedrossian ==
- Ara Bedrossian (born 1967), Cypriot professional footballer
- Pascal Bedrossian (born 1974), French professional footballer
- Patricio Bedrossian (born 1975), Argentine footballer
