= Bedros =

Bedros (Armenian: Պետրոս) is the Western Armenian pronunciation of the Armenian given name Petros, deriving from Greek Petros and equivalent to English Peter. All Armenian Catholic Patriarch-Catholicoi have Bedros as a middle name. Bedrosian (Eastern Armenian Petrosyan), meaning "son of Bedros/Petros," is also a common Armenian given name.

People with the given name include:

== Religious figures ==
- Peter I of Armenia, i.e. Bedros I Ketadarz (d. 1058)
- Bedros IV of Cilicia, Bedros IV Sarajian (1870–1940), Armenian Catholicos of Great House of Cilicia
- Various men who served as Armenian Patriarchs of Constantinople
- Various men who served as Armenian Patriarchs of Jerusalem

=== Middle name ===
- Abraham Petros I Ardzivian (1679–1749), Armenian Catholic patriarch of Cilicia
- Andon Bedros IX Hassoun (1809–1884), Armenian Catholic patriarch of Cilicia
- Hemaiag Bedros XVII Ghedighian (1905–1998), Armenian Catholic patriarch of Cilicia
- Hovhannes Bedros XVIII Kasparian (1927–2011), Armenian Catholic patriarch of Cilicia
- Ignatius Bedros XVI Batanian (1899–1979), Armenian Catholic patriarch of Cilicia
- Krikor Petros XX Gabroyan (1934–2021), Armenian Catholic patriarch of Cilicia
- Nerses Bedros XIX Tarmouni (1940–2015), Armenian Catholic patriarch of Cilicia
- Raphaël Bedros XXI Minassian (born 1946), Armenian Catholic patriarch of Cilicia

== Others ==
- Bedros (Bedik), Armenian merchant magnate of late 16th and first half of the 17th centuries
- Petros Adamian or Bedros Atamian (1849–1891), Ottoman-Armenian actor, poet, writer, artist and public figure
- Bedros Bedrosian (born 1955), Romanian-Armenian triple jumper
- Bedross Der Matossian (born 1978), American historian
- Bedros Hadjian (1933–2012), Buenos Aires-based Armenian writer, educator and journalist
- Bedros Kapamajian (1840–1912), Ottoman-Armenian businessmen, textile trader and mayor of the town of Van, Ottoman Empire
- Bedros Keresteciyan (1840–1907), Ottoman-Armenian linguist, journalist, translator and writer of the first etymology dictionary of the Turkish language
- Bedros Kirkorov (1932–2025), Bulgarian and Russian singer and bandleader of Armenian origin
- Bedros Magakyan (1826–1891), Ottoman-Armenian actor and theater director and founder of the Armenian Oriental Theatre
- Bedros Parian (1873–1896), better known by his nom de guerre Papken Siuni, an important figure in the Armenian national movement and the Armenian Revolutionary Federation
- Bedros Sirabyan (1833–1898), Ottoman-Armenian painter
- Bedros Tourian (1851–1872), Armenian poet, playwright and actor

== See also ==
- Petrosian
- Bedrosian
- Bedrossian
