= Princess of Joinville =

This article lists the ladies and princesses consort of Joinville, a historical lordship and later principality in the Champagne region of France. The title was held by the consorts of the lords and later princes of Joinville, passing through the House of Vaudémont, the House of Guise, the House of Joyeuse, the House of Bourbon, and the House of Orléans.

== Lady of Joinville ==
=== House of Vaudémont, 1417–1551 ===
Picture	Name	Father	Birth	Marriage	Became Consort	Ceased to be Consort	Death	Spouse
	Marie, Countess of Harcourt	John VII, Count of Harcourt (Harcourt)	9 September 1398	12 August 1416	28 April 1417 husband's accession	22 March 1458 husband's death	19 April 1476	Antoine
	Yolande, Duchess of Lorraine	René of Naples (Valois-Anjou)	2 November 1428	1445	22 March 1458 husband's accession	31 August 1470 husband's death	23 March 1483	Frederick II
	Joan, Countess of Tancarville	William, Count of Tancarville (Harcourt)	-	9 September 1471	1476 husband's accession	1485 marriage annulled	8 November 1488	René
	Philippa of Guelders	Adolf, Duke of Guelders (Egmond)	9 November 1467	1 September 1485		10 December 1508 husband's death	26 February 1547	René
	Antoinette de Bourbon	Francis, Count of Vendôme (Bourbon-La Marche)	25 December 1493	9 June 1513		12 April 1550 husband's death	22 January 1583	Claude I
	Anna d'Este	Ercole II d'Este (Este)	16 November 1531	29 April 1548	12 April 1550 husband's death	1551/2; Became Princess	17 May 1607	Francis I

== Princess of Joinville ==
=== House of Guise, 1551/2–1641 ===
Picture	Name	Father	Birth	Marriage	Became Princess	Ceased to be Princess	Death	Spouse
	Anna d'Este	Ercole II d'Este (Este)	16 November 1531	29 April 1548	1551/2; Became Princess	24 February 1563 husband's death	17 May 1607	Francis I
	Catherine of Cleves, Countess of Eu	Francis I, Duke of Nevers (De la Marck)	1548	4 October 1570		23 December 1588 husband's assassination	11 May 1633	Henry I
	Marie de Rohan, Mademoiselle de Montbazon	Hercule de Rohan, Duke of Montbazon (Rohan)	December 1600	21 April 1622		24 January 1657 husband's death	12 August 1679	Claude II
	Henriette Catherine, Duchess of Joyeuse	Henri de Joyeuse (Joyeuse)	8 January 1585	6 January 1611		30 September 1640 husband's death	25 February 1656	Charles
	Anna Maria Gonzaga	Charles I Gonzaga, Duke of Mantua (Gonzaga-Nevers)	1616	1639	30 September 1640 husband's accession	1641 divorce	6 July 1684	Henry II

=== House of Joyeuse, 1641–1654 ===
None

=== House of Guise, 1654–1688 ===
Picture	Name	Father	Birth	Marriage	Became Princess	Ceased to be Princess	Death	Spouse
	Élisabeth Marguerite d'Orléans, Duchess of Alençon and Angoulême	Gaston de France, Duke of Orléans (Bourbon)	26 December 1646	15 June 1667		30 July 1671 husband's death	17 March 1696	Louis Joseph

=== House of Bourbon, 1654–1693 ===
None

=== House of Orléans, since 1693 ===
Bolded name are Princess who actually used the title above any other of their titles.

Picture	Name	Father	Birth	Marriage	Became Princess	Ceased to be Princess	Death	Spouse
	Elizabeth Charlotte, Madame Palatine	Charles I Louis, Elector Palatine (Palatinate-Simmern)	27 May 1652	16 November 1671	5 April 1693 husband's accession	9 June 1701 husband's death	9 December 1722	Philippe I
	Françoise-Marie de Bourbon, Légitimée de France	Louis XIV of France (Bourbon (Illegitimate))	25 May 1677	18 February 1692	9 June 1701 husband's accession	2 December 1723 husband's death	1 February 1749	Philippe II
	Margravine Auguste Marie Johanna of Baden-Baden	Louis William, Margrave of Baden-Baden (Zähringen)	10 November 1704	13 July 1724		8 July 1726		Louis
	Louise Henriette de Bourbon, Mademoiselle de Conti; Duchess of Étampes	Louis Armand de Bourbon, Prince of Conti (Bourbon-Conti)	20 June 1726	17 December 1743	4 February 1752 husband's accession	9 February 1759		Louis Philippe I
	Louise Marie Adélaïde de Bourbon; Mademoiselle de Penthièvre	Louis Jean Marie de Bourbon, Duke of Penthièvre (Bourbon-Penthièvre)	13 March 1753	8 May 1768	18 November 1785 husband's accession	6 November 1793 husband's execution	23 June 1821	Louis Philippe II
	Princess Maria Amalia of Naples and Sicily	Ferdinand I of the Two Sicilies (Bourbon-Two Sicilies)	26 April 1782	25 November 1809		9 August 1830 became Queen consort	24 March 1866	Louis Philippe III
	**Princess Francisca of Brazil**	Pedro I of Brazil (House of Braganza)	2 August 1824	1 May 1843		27 March 1898		François II

== See also ==
- Duchess of Aumale
- Duchess of Mayenne
- Duchess of Lorraine
- Duchess of Guise
- Duchess of Orléans
