= Belarusian name =

A modern Belarusian name of a person consists of three parts: given name, patronymic, and family name (surname), according to the Eastern Slavic naming customs, similar to Russian names and Ukrainian names.

== Belarusian given names ==
As with most cultures, a person has a given name chosen by the parents. First names in East-Slavic languages mostly originate from three sources: Orthodox church tradition (which is itself of Greek origin), Catholic church tradition (which is itself of Latin origin) and native pre-Christian Slavic origin lexicons. Most names have several diminutive forms.

List of Belarusian names

- Арцём (Arciom)
- Аксана (Aksana; most common Ukrainian female name as Oksana; of Greek origin from Xenia)
- Алена (Alena, equivalent to Helen, of Greek origin)
- Аляксей (Alaksiej, of Greek origin)
- Аляксандр (Alaxandr, equivalent to Alexander, of Greek origin)
- Аляксандра (Alaxandra, equivalent to Alexandra, of Greek origin)
- Анатоль (Anatol, equivalent to Greek Anatolios, of Greek origin)
- Андрэй (Andrej, equivalent to Andrew, of Greek origin)
- Вадзім (Vadzim, equivalent to Persian Bademus)
- Васіль, Базыль (Vasil (orthodox) or Bazyl (catholic) of Greek origin)
- Віктар (Viktar, equivalent to Victor, of Latin origin)
- Вольга (Volha, a pre-Christian name derived from Varangian Helga)
- Ганна (Hanna, equivalent to Ann, of Hebrew origin)
- Дар'я (Darja)
- Дзмітры, Зміцер (Dzmitry or Zmicier of Greek origin)
- Ігар (Ihar, a pre-Christian name derived from Varangian Ingvarr or Inglar)
- Сяргей (Siarhiej, of Latin origin)
- Станіслаў (Stanisłaŭ, of Slavic origin)
- Тацяна (Taciana, equivalent to Latin Tatius, of Latin origin)
- Кацярына (Kaciaryna, equivalent to Catherine, of Greek origin)
- Кірыла (Kiryła, of Greek origin)
- Леанід, Лявон (Leanid or Lavon from Leonidas, of Greek origin)
- Марыя (Maryja, equivalent to Mary, of Hebrew origin)
- Міхал, Міхась (Michał or Michaś, equivalent to Michael, of Hebrew origin)
- Мікалай (Mikałaj, equivalent to Nicholas, of Greek origin)
- Наталля (Natallja, equivalent to Natalie, of Latin origin)
- Настасся (Nastassia, equivalent to Anastasia, of Greek origin)
- Паўло, Павел (Paŭło or Pavieł, equivalent to Paul, of Latin origin)
- Пятро, Пятрусь (Piatro or Piatruś, equivalent to Peter, of Greek origin)
- Раман (Raman, of Latin origin)
- Уладзіслаў (Uładzisłaŭ, equivalent to Vladislav)
- Уладзімір (Uładzimir, a pre-Christian name of Slavic origin)
- Францішак (Francišak, of Latin origin)
- Юры (Jury, equivalent to George, of Greek origin)
- Юлія (Julija, equivalent to Julia or Julie, of Latin origin)
- Яраслаў (Jarasłaŭ, a pre-Christian name of Slavic origin)
- Ян, Іван (Jan or Ivan, equivalent to John, of Hebrew origin)

== Belarusian family names (surnames) ==
In Belarus and most of the former Polish–Lithuanian Commonwealth, surnames first appeared during the late Middle Ages. They initially denoted the differences between various people living in the same town or village and bearing the same name. The conventions were similar to those of English surnames, using occupations, patronymic descent, geographic origins, or personal characteristics.

Belarusian surnames, like those in most of Europe, are hereditary and generally patrilineal, i.e., passed from the father on to his children.

Depending on the region, Belarusian surnames could have a different form and different ending.

One very large group of surnames end with the common Slavonic suffixes -vič (wicz) and -ič (icz) (Daškievič, Šuškievič, Vajciuškievič, Mackievič, Mickievič, Misilevič) or -cki and -ski (feminine form -ckaja and -skaja: Navicki, Kalinoŭski, Pilecki, Rusiecki, Sadoŭski, Caŭłoŭski, Bialaŭski).

One common suffix in surnames is -čuk (Ramančuk, Kačuk, Kavalčuk) or its simplified versions -iuk and -juk (Maliuk, Masiuk).

Another group includes surnames with the suffix -ka, corresponding to the suffix -ko found in Ukrainian name (Łukašenka, Jakavienka, Haponienka), -onak, -jonak (-ionak), -enak (Malašonak, Manionak).

Another suffix is -jenia (-ienia) (Majsienia, Astapienia, Jurčenia, Hierasimienia).

== See also ==
- Slavic names
- Slavic surnames
