= Petros =

Petros, the original Greek version of the name Peter, meaning "stone" or "rock". Also an Armenian and Coptic name. May refer to:

== People ==
- Petros (given name)
- Petros (surname)
- Petros (footballer), Brazilian footballer Petros Matheus dos Santos Araújo (born 1989)

== Places ==
- Petros (Chornohora), a mountain in Ukraine
- Petros, Oklahoma, United States, an unincorporated community
- Petros, Tennessee, United States, an unincorporated community and census-designated place

== Other uses ==
- Petros (pelican), mascot of the Greek island of Mykonos
- Petros Guitars, guitar ensemble
- Petroleum Sarawak Berhad or PETROS, state-owned company in Sarawak, Malaysia
- Petro's Chili & Chips, a restaurant franchise based in Knoxville, Tennessee
