= Pēteris =

Male given name

- Gender: Male
- Name day: 29 June

Origin
- Region of origin: Latvia

Pēteris is a Latvian language masculine given name. It is a cognate of the name Peter and may refer to:

- Pēteris Juraševskis (1872–1945), Latvian politician and former Prime Minister of Latvia
- Pēteris Kalniņš (born 1988), Latvian luger and Olympic competitor
- Pēteris Lauks (1902–1984), Latvian football defender
- Pēteris Pētersons (1923–1998), Latvian playwright, theatre director and drama critic, theorist, translator, journalist and social activist
- Pēteris Plakidis (1947–2017), Latvian composer and pianist
- Pēteris Skudra (born 1973), Latvian professional ice hockey goaltender
- Pēteris Stučka (1865–1932), Latvian politician, writer, translator, editor, jurist and president of the Supreme Court of the Soviet Union
- Pēteris Vasks (born 1946), Latvian composer
- Pēteris Zeltiņš (1914–1994), Latvian racewalker and Olympic competitor
