= Putros =

Putros, Poutrus, or Putrus, is an Arabic surname, a transliteration variant of Boutros. Notable people with the surname include:

- Basmah Yousif Putros (born 1963), Iraqi Assyrian politician
- Frans Putros (born 1993), footballer
