= Princess Francisca of Brazil =

Francisca of Brazil
- Princess of Joinville
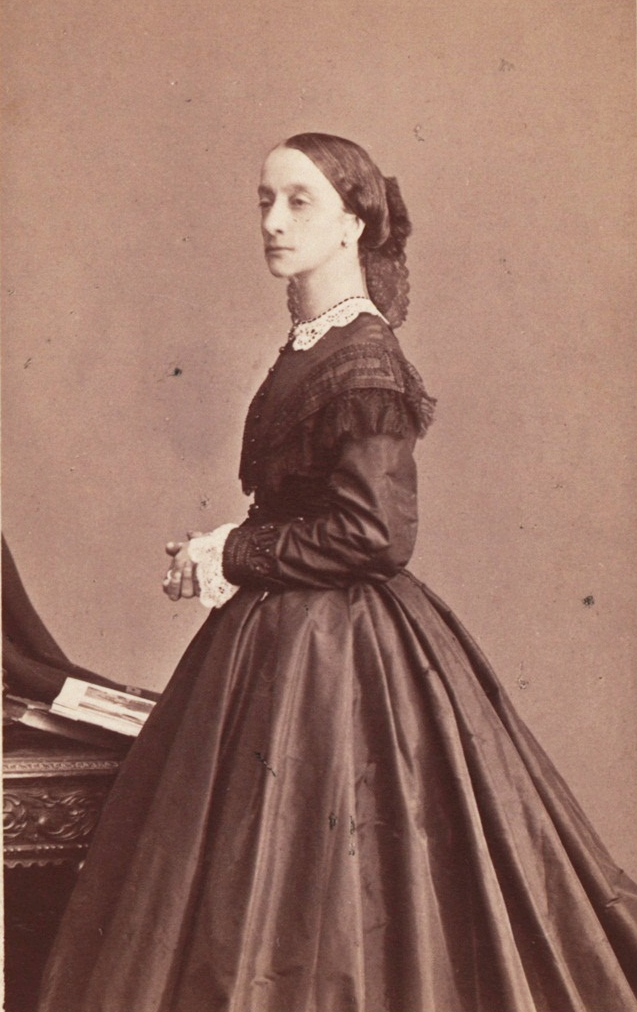
- Photograph by Ludwig Angerer, around 1865
- Born: 2 August 1824; Palace of São Cristóvão, Rio de Janeiro, Empire of Brazil
- Died: 27 March 1898 (aged 73); Paris, France
- Burial: Royal Chapel of Dreux
- Spouse: François, Prince of Joinville (m. 1843)
- Issue Detail: Françoise, Duchess of Chartres; Pierre, Duke of Penthièvre
Names
- Portuguese: Francisca Carolina Joana Carlota Leopoldina Romana Xavier de Paula Micaela Gabriela Rafaela Gonzaga; French: Françoise Caroline Jeanne Charlotte Léopoldine Romane Xavier de Pauline Michelle Gabrielle Raphaëlle Gonzague
- House: Braganza
- Father: Pedro I of Brazil
- Mother: Maria Leopoldina of Austria

Dona Francisca (2 August 1824 – 27 March 1898) was a princess of the Empire of Brazil (as daughter of Emperor Dom Pedro I, who also reigned as King Dom Pedro IV of Portugal, and his first wife Maria Leopoldina of Habsburg), who became Princess of Joinville upon marrying François d’Orléans, son of the French king Louis Philippe I. The couple had three children. Through their oldest daughter, Francisca and François are the ancestors of Jean, Count of Paris, the present Orléanist pretender to the French throne.

== Biography ==
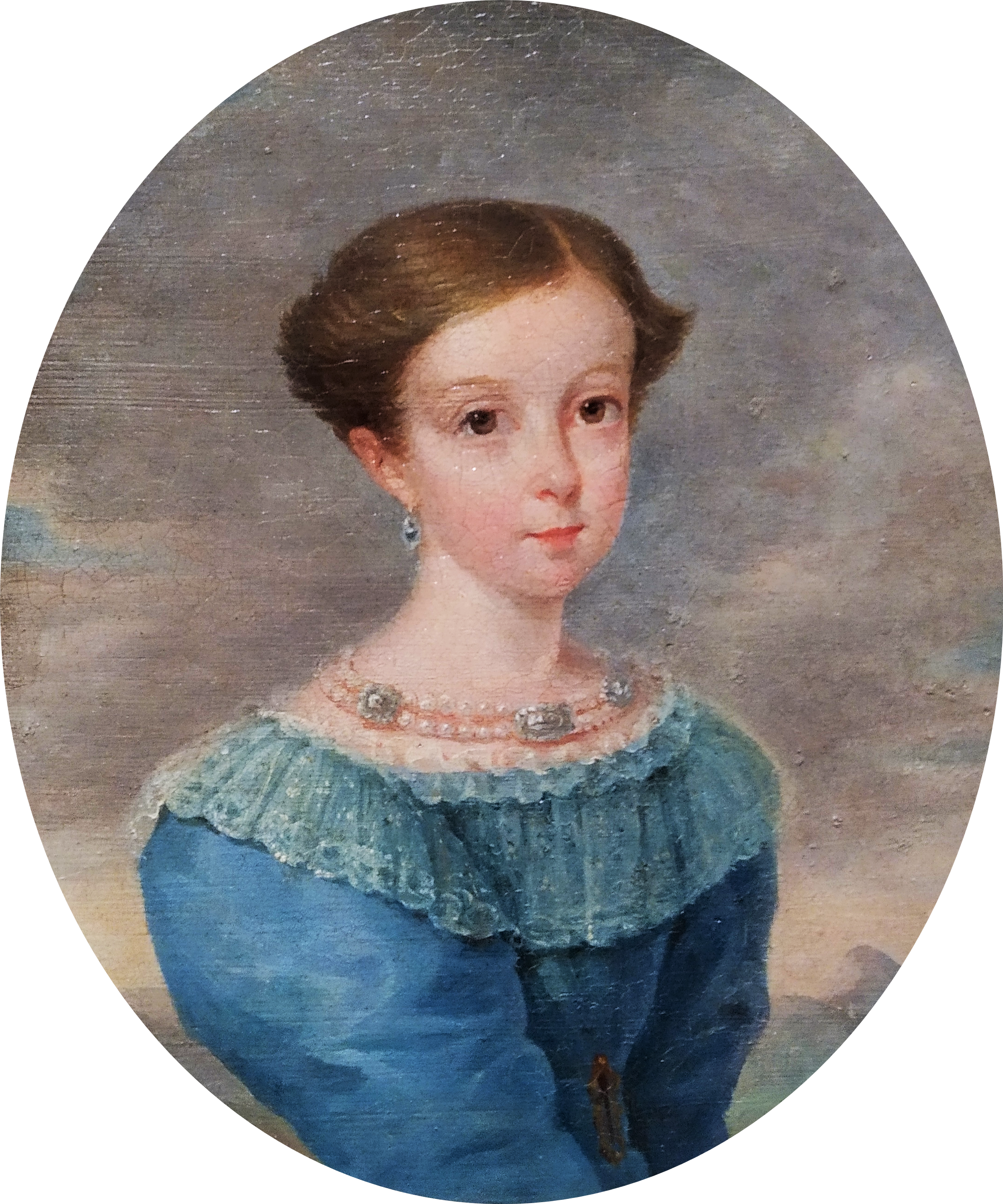
Portrait by Simplício Rodrigues de Sá, c. 1830

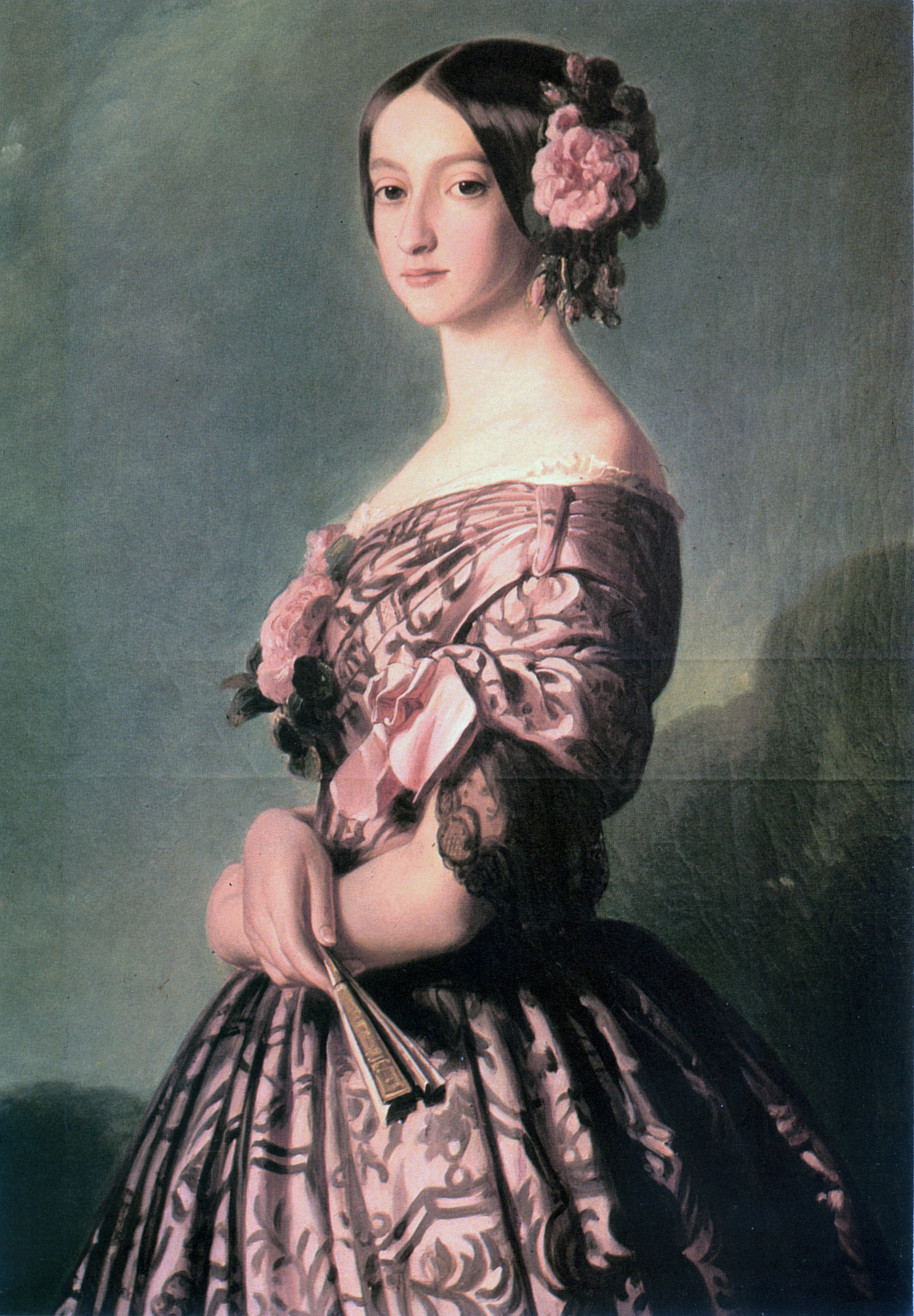
Francisca of Brazil, Princess of Joinville, 1850s. Painting by Franz Xaver Winterhalter

Francisca was born on 2 August 1824 in the Palace of São Cristóvão, in Rio de Janeiro, capital of the Empire of Brazil. Her name in full was Francisca Carolina Joana Carlota Leopoldina Romana Xavier de Paula Micaela Gabriela Rafaela Gonzaga. Through her father, Emperor Dom Pedro I, she was a member of the Brazilian branch of the House of Braganza (Portuguese: Bragança) and was referred to using the honorific "Dona" (Lady) from birth. Her mother was the Archduchess Maria Leopoldina of Austria, daughter of Franz II, the last Holy Roman Emperor. Through her, Francisca was a niece of Napoleon Bonaparte and first cousin of Emperors Napoleon II of France, Franz Joseph I of Austria-Hungary and Don Maximiliano I (Maximilian I) of Mexico.

Francisca married Prince François of Orléans, the third son of Louis Philippe I and his Italian Queen Maria Amalia of Naples. François called the Prince of Joinville, and Francisca married in Rio de Janeiro on 1 May 1843. The bride was 19, the groom 25. Her portrait was painted when she arrived in Paris, in 1844, by Ary Scheffer (coll. Musée de la Vie romantique, Paris). Queen Victoria met the young couple at the Château d'Eu in 1843, and wrote: "Little Chica (Madame Hadji) is a charming, sprightly, lively little creature, with immense brown eyes."

Their only daughter Princess Françoise of Orléans married her first cousin Prince Robert, Duke of Chartres and became the mother of the Orléanist pretender Prince Jean, Duke of Guise. Her son Pierre never married, but had two illegitimate children by a married woman.

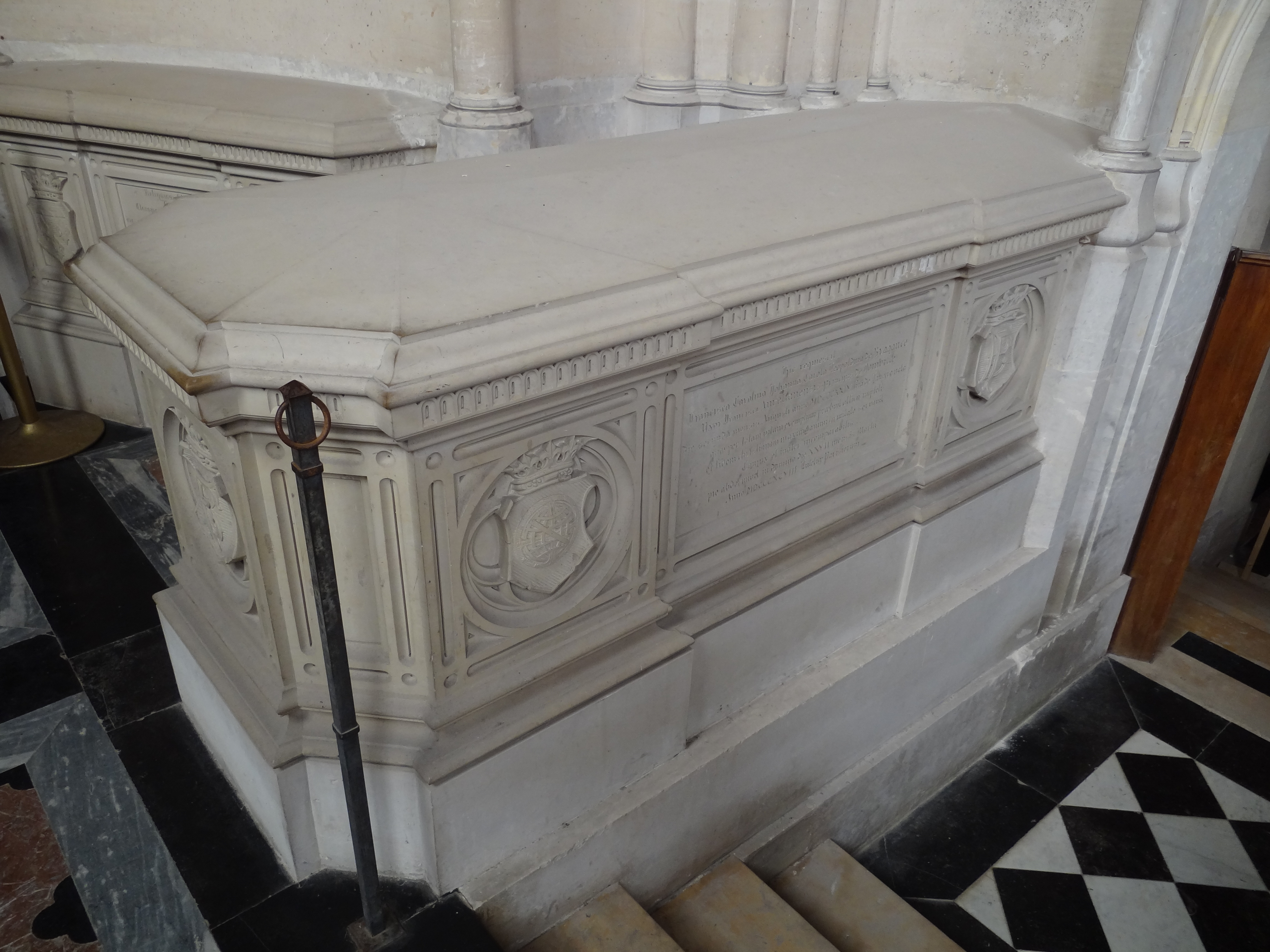
Tomb of Princess Francisca in the Royal Chapel of Dreux

When the Orléans family fled France, they settled in England living at Claremont; It was there that Francisca gave birth to a stillborn daughter in 1849; the next year, the exiled King Louis Philippe I died himself. After the fall of the House of Bonaparte of the Second Empire, the Orléans family returned to France; Francisca herself died in Paris aged 73. By the end of her life, she was very deaf. Her husband outlived her by two years, dying in Paris in 1900.

== Gallery ==
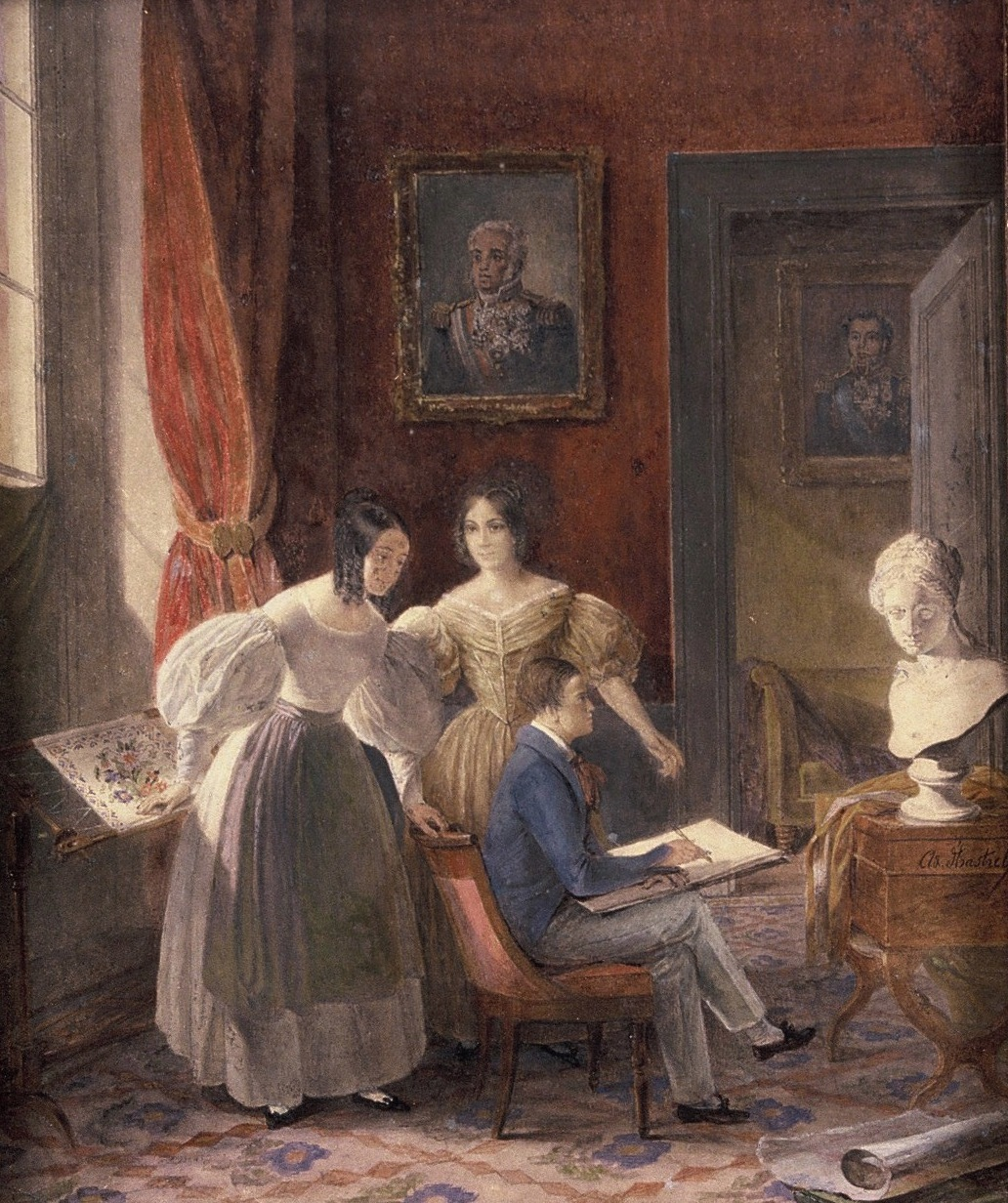
Francisca with her siblings, Pedro II and Januária in 1839.

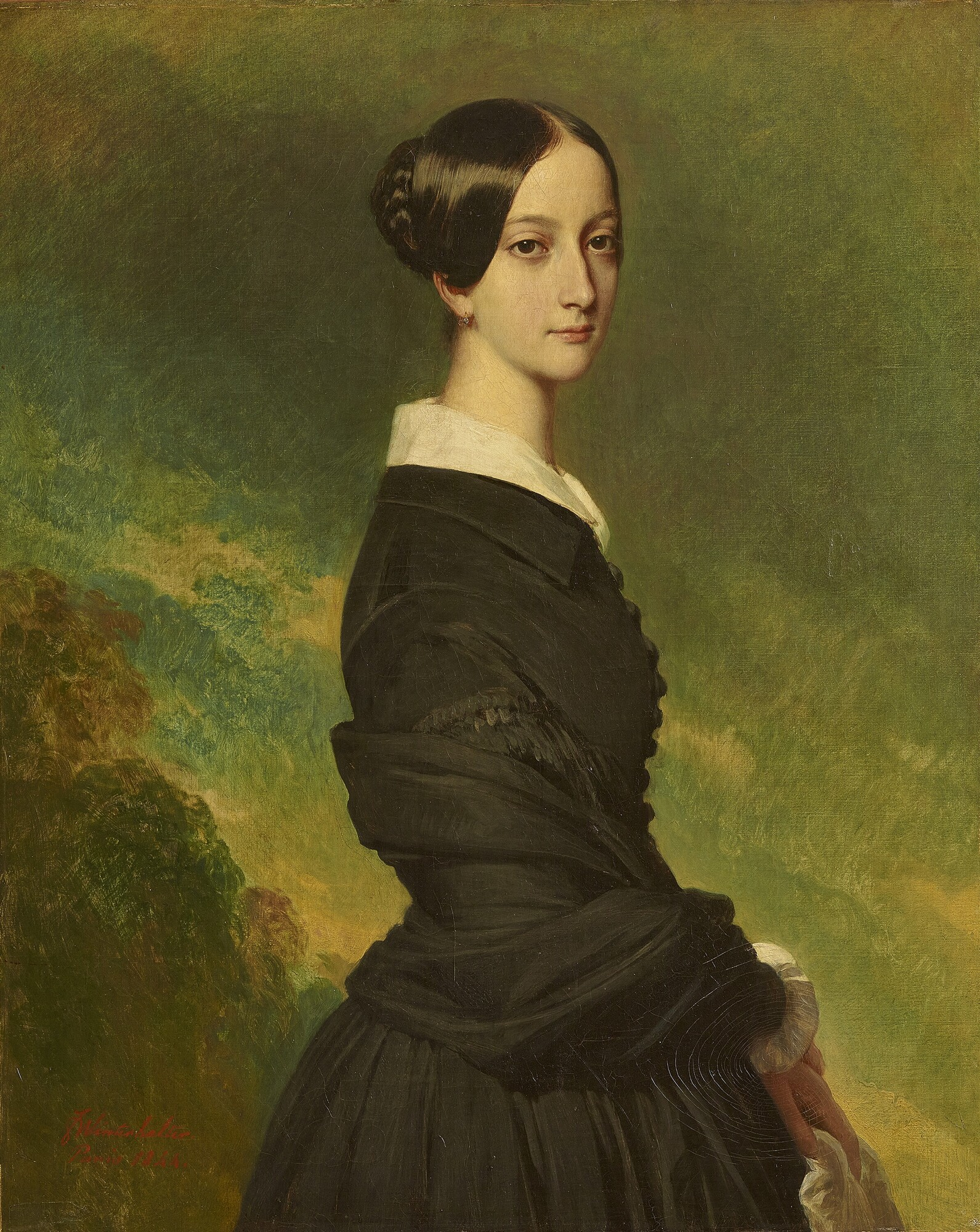
Portrait by Franz Xaver Winterhalter in 1844. Currently desplayed at the Palace of Versailles.

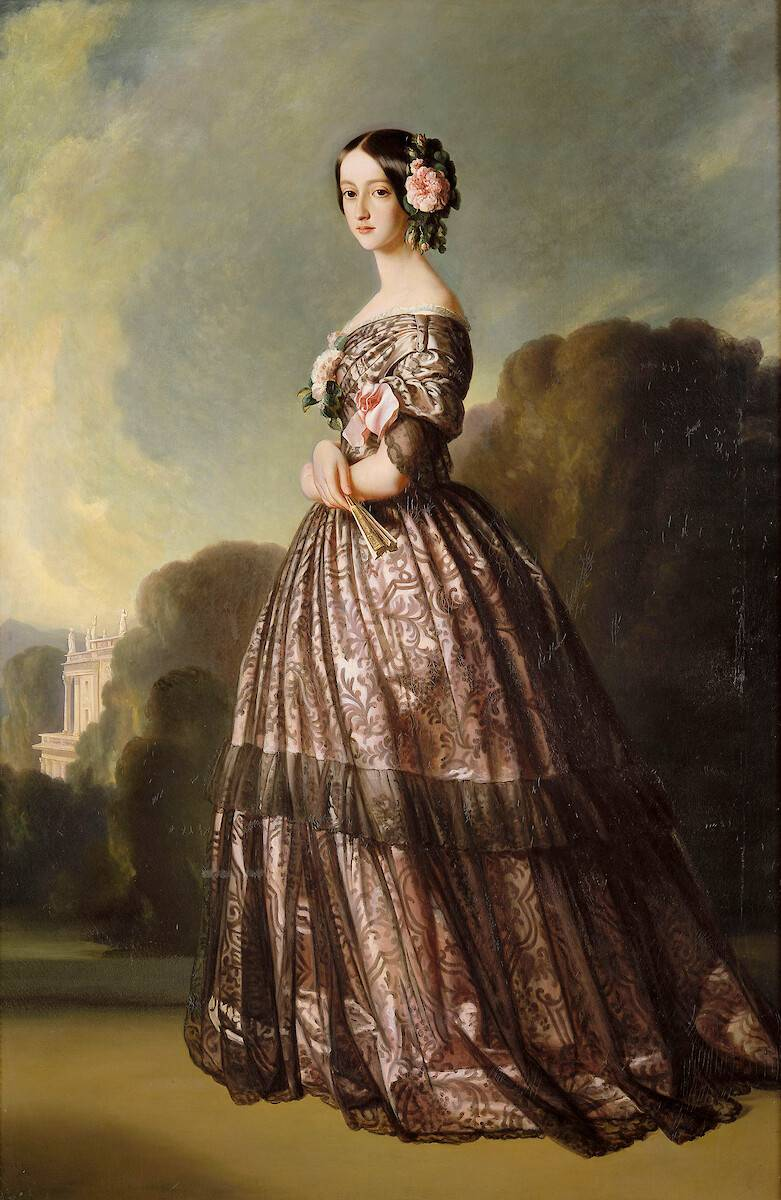
Portrait in 1846 by Franz Xaver Winterhalter.

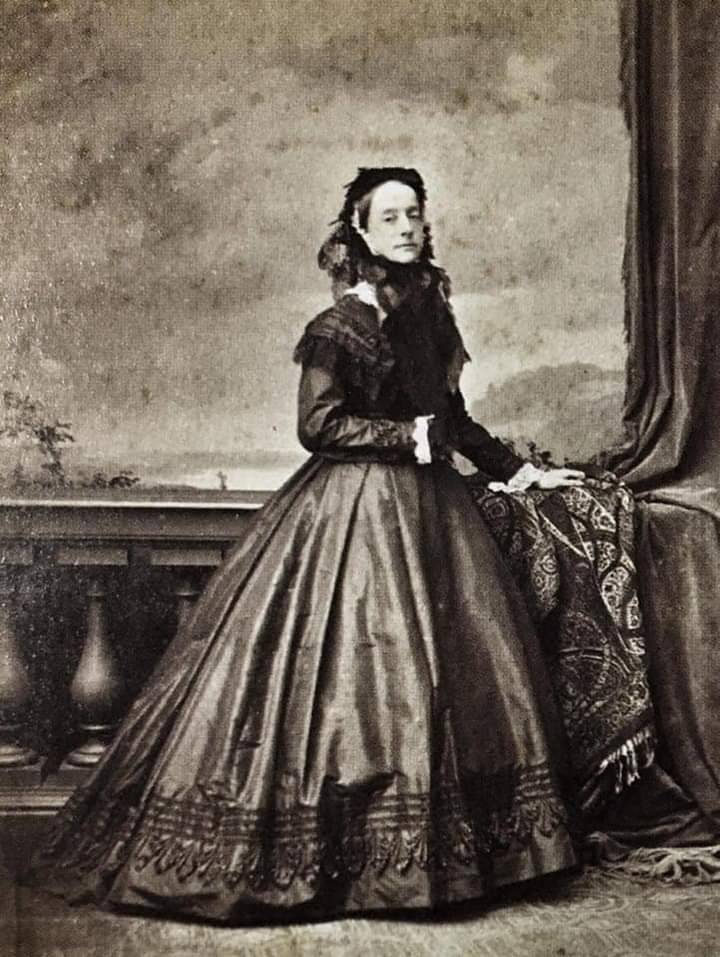
The Princess of Joinville (undated)

== Issue ==
1. Princess Françoise of Orléans (14 August 1844 – 28 October 1925) married her cousin Prince Robert, Duke of Chartres and had issue.
2. Prince Pierre, Duke of Penthièvre (4 November 1845 – 17 July 1919) never married, but had two children with Angélique Lebesgue.
3. Stillborn daughter (28 October 1849)

== Ancestry ==
Ancestors of Princess Francisca of Brazil

8. Peter III of Portugal
4. John VI of Portugal and Brazil
9. Maria I of Portugal and Brazil
2. Pedro I of Brazil and IV of Portugal
10. Charles IV of Spain
5. Carlota Joaquina of Spain
11. Maria Luisa of Parma
1. Princess Francisca of Brazil
12. Leopold II, Holy Roman Emperor
6. Francis II, Holy Roman Emperor
13. Maria Luisa of Spain
3. Maria Leopoldina of Austria
14. Ferdinand I of the Two Sicilies
7. Maria Theresa of Naples and Sicily
15. Maria Carolina of Austria
