= Boutros =

- Pronunciation: Arabic: [ˈbutˤrus] Egyptian Arabic: [ˈbotˤɾos]
- Gender: Male

Origin
- Origin: Arabic or Mediterranean
- Meaning: Stone

Other names
- Alternative spelling: Botros, Butrus
- Related names: Peter, Pierre, Pedro

Boutros, Botros or Butrus (Arabic: بطرس) is the Arabic form of the name Peter, derived directly from Greek Πέτρος (Petros) and also complimented by Coptic: ⲡⲉⲧⲣⲟⲥ and Syriac: ܦܛܪܘܣ. It is generally used as a male given name, but may also be used as a surname.

Notable persons with the name Boutros or variants include:

== Given name ==
- Pope Peter V of Alexandria (reigned 1340 to 1348), Coptic Pope and Patriarch of the See of St. Mark
- Pope Peter VI of Alexandria (reigned 1718 to 1726), Coptic Pope and Patriarch of the See of St. Mark
- Pope Peter VII of Alexandria (reigned 1809 to 1852), Coptic Pope and Patriarch of the See of St. Mark
- Ignatius Peter VII Jarweh (1777–1851), Patriarch of the Syrian Catholic Church
- Boutros Boutros-Ghali (1922–2016), Egyptian diplomat; Secretary General of the United Nations 1992–96
- Butrus al-Bustani (1818–1883), Lebanese writer and scholar
- Boutros Ghali (1846–1910), Prime Minister of Egypt
- Youssef Boutros Ghali (born 1952), Egyptian politician
- Boutros Al-Hallaq (born 1966), Syrian politician
- Boutros Harb (born 1944), Lebanese politician
- Boutros Khawand (born 1940), Lebanese politician, kidnapped and now missing
- Boutros Mouallem (1928–2026), Arabic Melkite Greek Catholic hierarch
- Bechara Boutros al-Rahi (born 1940), Maronite Patriarch of Antioch
- Nasrallah Boutros Sfeir (1920–2019), patriarch emeritus of the Maronite Catholic Church

== Surname ==
- Andrew S. Boutros, American law professor
- Angele Botros Samaan
- Basimah Yusuf Butrus
- Danella Butrus, Iraqi Australian soccer player
- Fouad Boutros
- Julia Boutros
- Maher Boutros
- Zakaria Botros

== See also ==
- Putros
