= Artur Petrosyan (journalist) =

Russian journalist

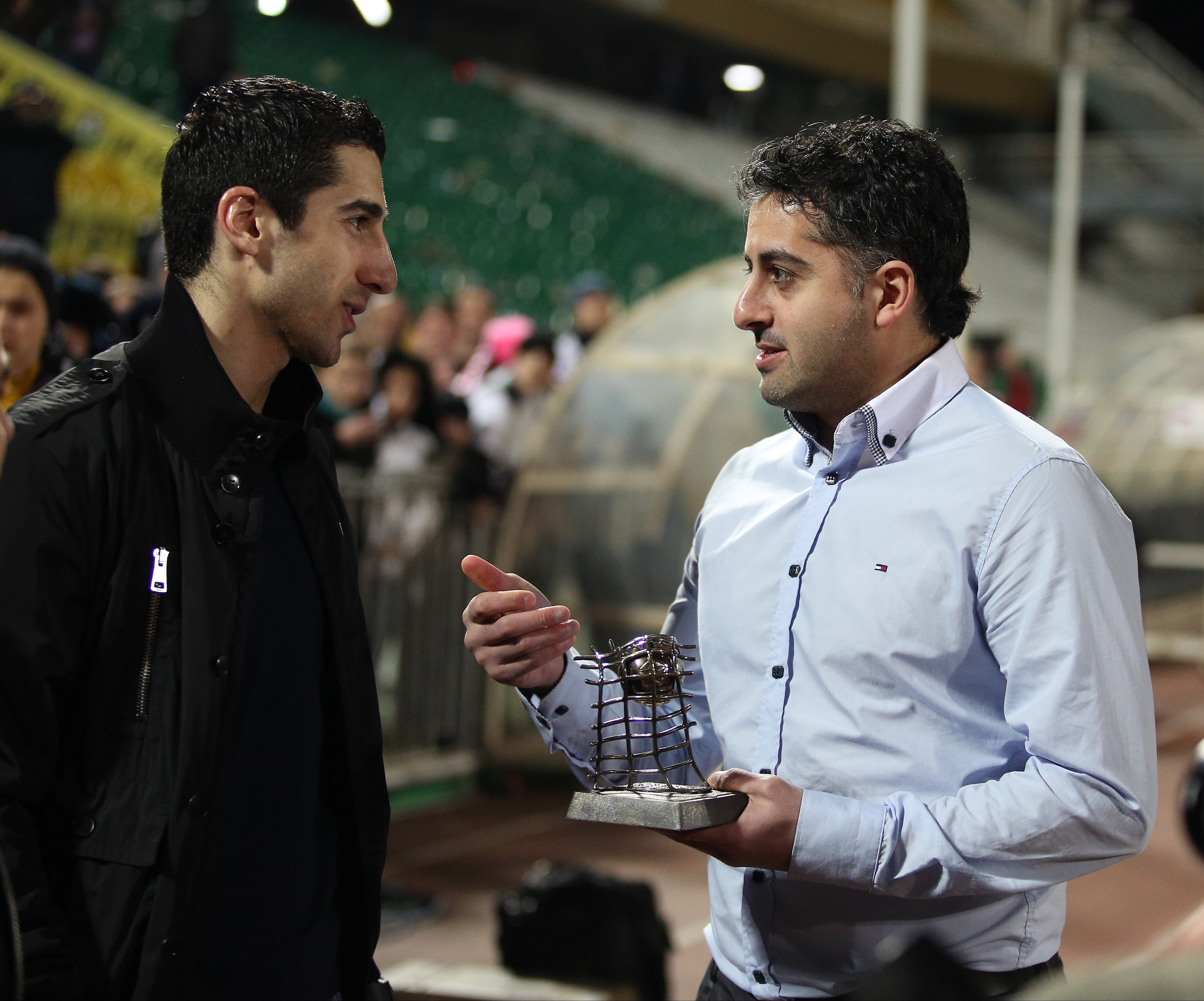
- Born: 21 September 1979 (age 47); Moscow, Soviet Union
- Education: Moscow State University of Economics, Statistics, and Informatics
- Occupations: Sports journalist, editor-in-chief, football scout
- Website: twitter.com/arturpetrosyan

Artur Petrosyan (Russian: Арту́р Петросья́н; born 21 September 1979 in Moscow, Soviet Union) is a Russian football journalist, editor-in-chief and football scout.

He is best known for his time at the oldest Russian sports magazine, Futbol, Russia-2 TV channel, Sport Express, daily and occasional contributions to such media outlets as The Guardian, ESPN FC, The New York Times, and the BBC.

Petrosyan represents Russia in the jury of the biggest media annual voting on the Player of the Year, held by The Guardian, since 2014.

He also scouts for young football talent in Russia and the CIS for the Guardian's annual feature.

== Career ==
After receiving a Master of Economics degree from the Moscow State University of Economics, Statistics, and Informatics, he worked at the Sberbank of Russia and Rosneft before quitting and pursuing a career in football.

His first position was at Dynamo Moscow Football Club in 2001 as a presenter, interpreter and stadium announcer for international matches. Petrosyan was Dick Advocaat's translator during the UEFA Cup match with Glasgow Rangers, which he managed at the time, and this indirectly served as the beginning of a new football-related stage of his career.

In 2003, he started writing for the Football magazine, mostly concentrating on investigative journalism and interviewing foreign football players coming to Russia.

In 2007, Petrosyan became the chief football editor at the Russia-2 state TV channel's official website Sportbox.ru. He also hosted live shows with football celebrities like Oliver Kahn, Ruud Gullit and Bebeto among others.

In 2013, he became the editor-in-chief of Sport Express digital. In 2016, after a dispute with the owners over a collective redundancy at the outlet, which led to his resignation, he started a new project called Sportfakt.ru along with most of the sacked Sport Express journalists and became its editor-in-chief.

Petrosyan has worked at major football events, such as World Cups, European Championships, Champions League and Europa League finals as an observer, reporter and a head of editorial board. He's interviewed many footballers like Cristiano Ronaldo, Henrikh Mkhitaryan and others, but the most remarkable interview he's ever had, as Petrosyan once stated, was with Bruce Grobbelaar during the 2010 FIFA World Cup in South Africa.

During the UEFA Euro 2016 tournament Petrosyan was analysing and predicting football matches from France for The Bookmaker Ratings website, competing with other experts. He won the contest with the best result and the biggest return on investment.

As a football scout, he considers his achievement to be the discovery of the little-known at the time Daniil Utkin, Khvicha Kvaratskhelia, Zuriko Davitashvili and Arsen Zakharyan.

Since 2017, he has been a UEFA reporter at the matches of the Russian national team and Russian clubs in European club competitions.

== Personal life ==
Petrosyan participates in international backgammon competitions. In 2017, he became an unofficial speedgammon world champion at the world's biggest backgammon event Merit Open.

In an interview, he admitted that a DNA test he took showed family ties with the former captain of Spartak Moscow and the Russian national team, Yegor Titov.
