= Piatro =

Piatro is a Belarusian masculine given name, equivalent to the English Peter. It is borne by:

- Piatro Chatuloŭ, Belarusian literary critic killed in Stalin's 1937 mass execution of Belarusians
- Piatro Kravchanka (born 1950), Belarusian politician, diplomat, political scientist and historian, last Minister of Foreign Affairs of the Byelorussian SSR and first Minister of Foreign Affairs of Belarus
- Piatro Sadoŭski (1941–2026), Belarusian linguist, politician and diplomat
