= Petros (surname) =

Petros is the surname of:

- Abune Petros (1882–1936), Ethiopian bishop and martyr born Haile Maryam
- Amanal Petros (born 1995), German long-distance runner
- Beyene Petros (1950–2024), Ethiopian biology professor and politician
- George Petros (born 1955), American art designer, author, editor, interviewer and illustrator
- Hanna Petros (1896–1958), Iraqi-Assyrian composer and scholar
- Tim Petros (1961–2020), Canadian football player
- Walatta Petros (1592–1642), Ethiopian saint
