= Bedros Sirabyan =

Ottoman painter of Armenian descent

Bedros Sirabyan (1833 – 1898) was an Ottoman painter of Armenian descent. He was also known as Monsieur Pierre.

== Life ==
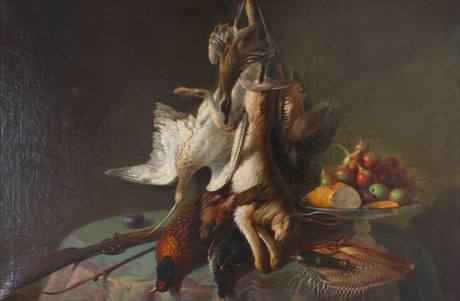
Hunting Still Life (1894)

Bedros Sirabyan was born in the Ortakoy district of Constantinople in Ottoman Turkey. In 1849 he attended the prestigious Jemaran Armenian Lyceum in Uskudar. At the school, he illustrated the bimonthly school magazine. After graduating, he completed his education in Rome, and then returned to Constantinople, where he worked as an artist for the Balyans, the family famous for architecture.

He executed painted decorations for the Yeni Theatre in Beyoglu, the Nersesyan Mansion (now the Greek Consulate), Tasciyan House (Proti Hotel) on Kinaliada, gilded interior decorations of the Dolmabahçe Palace, and the section of the Yildiz Kosk allocated to Kaiser Wilhelm during his state visit to Istanbul. He taught art at Robert College, the Berberyan Lyceum, and other Armenian schools, and gave art lessons to the architect Nerses Bey. He did a large portrait of Sultan Abdulaziz, and is said to have been described as the "Small Ivan Aivazovsky" by the sultan. His studio was at 16 Çaylak Street in Pera. His other notable works include The Cemetery, The Turkish Coffeehouse, and The Young Siblings. At the end of 1893 he was invited by Khrimian Hayrik to Echmiatsin to decorate specific areas of the church.

Sirabyan died in 1898 in Sofia, Bulgaria.
