= Pierre Thomas =

Pierre Thomas could refer to:

- Pierre Thomas (American football) (born 1984), American football player
- Pierre Thomas (journalist), American journalist
- Pierre Thomas (scholar) (1634–1698), French scholar and author
- Pierre “P” Thomas (co-founder of Quality Control Music)
