= Armen Petrosyan =

Armen Petrosyan may refer to:

- Armen Petrosyan (actor) (born 1975), Armenian actor, producer and broadcaster
- Armen Petrosyan (kickboxer) (born 1986), Armenian-born Italian kickboxer
- Armen Petrosyan (fighter) (born 1990), Russian-Armenian mixed martial artist
