= Petrossian (business) =

Armenian-founded French caviar and drink company

- Trade name: Petrossian, S.A.
- Company type: Private
- Industry: Retail (specialty foods)
- Founded: 1920; 106 years ago as Petrossian; Paris, France
- Founder: Melkoum Petrossian; Mouchegh Petrossian
- Headquarters: Paris, France
- Number of locations: 7 (2023)
- Area served: Europe, North America, Asia
- Owner: Petrossian family
- Parent: Petrossian Société Anonyme

Petrossian, (officially Petrossian S.A.) is a French company founded in 1920 by two Armenian brothers, Melkoum Petrossian and Mouchegh Petrossian, who introduced caviar to Paris, France. Over the years, the Petrossian family has passed on its knowledge and expertise in the art of caviar maturation, a traditional craftmanship still done by hand in house, by Petrossian's caviarologists.

In addition to caviar and fine food, the company started branching into smoked fish in the 1930s.

== History ==
In 2001, the company expanded its operations by opening a new production site in Angers, France. It also widened its fine food offering. By 2023, Petrossian remained a prominent global caviar label, achieving a cumulative sales figure of 60 million euros and commanding an estimated 15-20% share of the worldwide caviar market.

Petrossian still has the flagship historic shop opened in Paris, 1920, at 18 boulevard de La Tour-Maubourg, leading several other fashionable boutiques, restaurants and subsidiaries in Paris, Brussels, Bangkok, Switzerland, Los Angeles, Las Vegas, New-York, Hong Kong, Singapore and London, the later opening in 2022, soon followed by another venture within The Savoy early 2024.

To this day, the company is still 100% family-owned and now run by Mikael and Alexandre Petrossian, grandsons of one of the founders, Mouchegh Petrossian.
