= Pierre-Simon =

Pierre-Simon is a French masculine given name, and may refer to:

- Pierre-Simon Ballanche (1776–1847), a French writer and counterrevolutionary philosopher
- Pierre Simon Fournier (1712–1768), a French typographer
- Pierre-Simon Girard (1765–1836), a French mathematician and engineer
- Pierre-Simon Laplace (1749–1827), a French mathematician and astronomer

== See also ==
- Pierre Simon
- Pierre Simon (1885–1977)
