= John Wallace Pierre =

John Wallace Pierre from the University of Wyoming, Laramie, WY was named Fellow of the Institute of Electrical and Electronics Engineers (IEEE) in 2013 for development of signal processing methods for estimation of power-system stability.
