= Pierre Levasseur =

Pierre Levasseur may refer to:

- Pierre Levasseur (aircraft builder) (1890–1941), French aircraft builder
- Pierre Émile Levasseur (1828–1911), French economist
- A colonial head of French Sénégal from September 1807 to 13 July 1809
- The protagonist of the 2006 French film The Valet
- A French shipbuilder, son of René-Nicolas Levasseur

== See also ==
- Levasseur (disambiguation)
