= Lucky Pierre =

Lucky Pierre may refer to:

- The Adventures of Lucky Pierre, a 1961 nudie cutie-sexploitation film
- L. Pierre, a musical project by Scottish musician Aidan Moffat
- Lucky Pierre (band), an American band fronted by Kevin McMahon and including one-time member Trent Reznor
- Pierre Larouche, ice hockey forward, nicknamed Lucky Pierre
- "Lucky Pierre", a song in Act I of Leonard Sillman's Broadway musical New Faces of 1952
- Lucky Pierre (film), a 1974 French comedy film
- Pierre Salinger, journalist, press secretary to President Kennedy, and (briefly) US Senator
  - Lucky Pierre, a lawyer played by Salinger in an episode of the 1960s television program Batman
- The middle partner in a threesome
