= Pjetër =

Pjetër or Për is an Albanian male given name, which is a cognate of Peter, derived ultimately from the Greek word petros, meaning "stone" or "rock". The name may refer to:

- Pjetër Arbnori (1936–2006), Albanian politician
- Pjetër Bogdani (1627–1689), Albanian writer
- Pjetër Budi (1566–1622), Albanian writer
- Pjetër Dungu (1908–1989), Albanian musician
- Pjetër Gaci (1931–1995), Albanian composer
- Pjetër Gjoka (1912–1982), Albanian actor
- Pjetër Losha (died 1374), Albanian nobleman
- Pjetër Malota (born 1959), Albanian actor
- Pjetër Mazreku (1584–1634), Albanian bishop
- Pjetër Poga (1860–1944), Albanian politician
- Pjetër Shpani (died 1457), Albanian nobleman
- Pjetër Zaharia (died 1414), Albanian bishop
- Pjetër Zarishi (1806–1866), Albanian writer
