= Pierre, Duke of Penthièvre =

Pierre d'Orléans
- Duke of Penthièvre
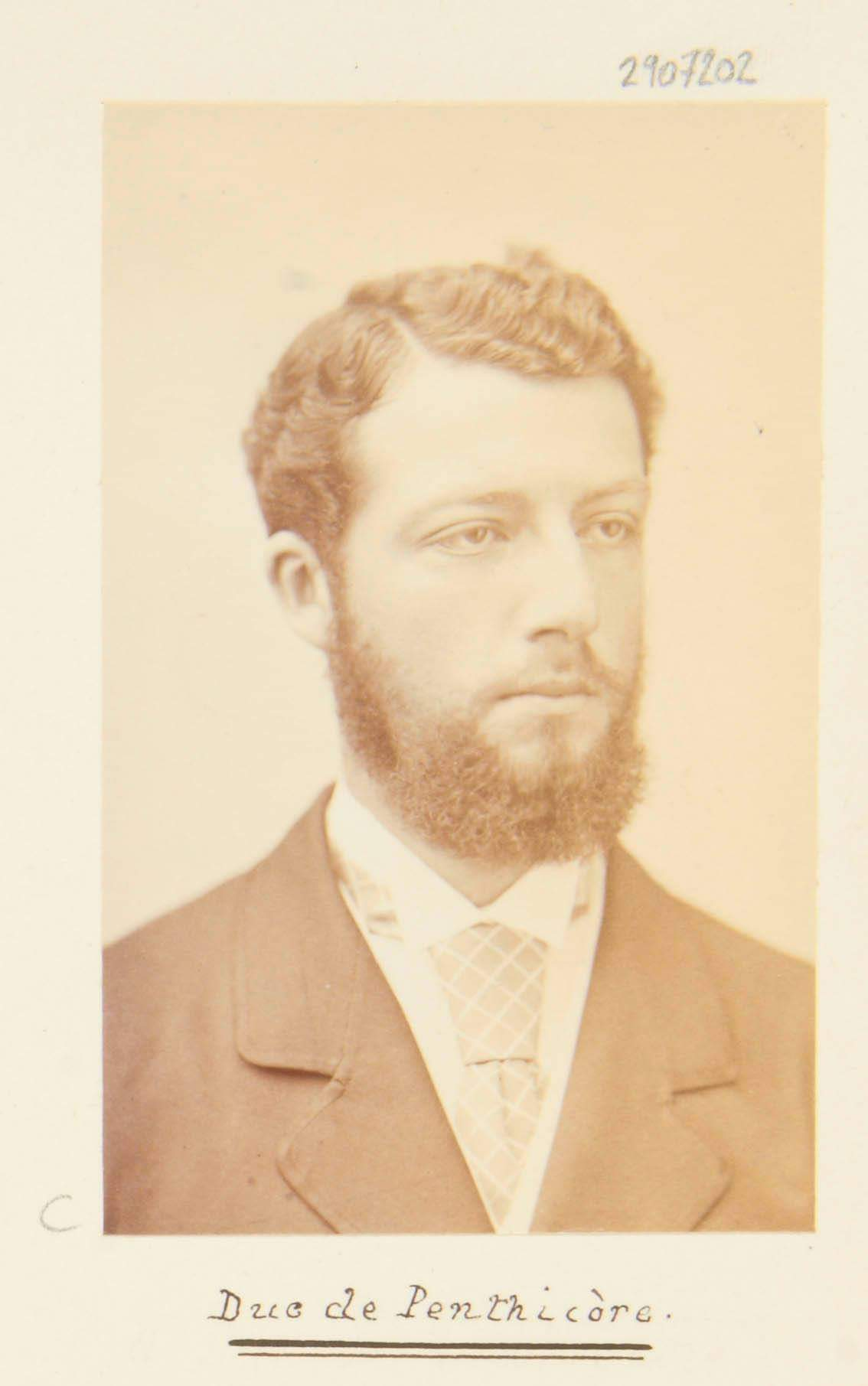
- Pierre d'Orléans, Duke of Penthièvre, c. 1880
- Born: 4 November 1845; Saint-Cloud, France
- Died: 17 July 1919 (aged 73); Paris, France
- Burial: Chapelle royale de Dreux
- Partner: Angélique Lebesgue
- Issue: Jeanne Lebesgue; Pierre Fernand Eugène Lebesgue
Names
- Pierre Philippe Jean Marie d'Orléans
- House: House of Orléans
- Father: François d'Orléans, Prince of Joinville
- Mother: Princess Francisca of Brazil

Pierre Philippe Jean Marie d'Orléans (4 November 1845 – 17 July 1919) was Duke of Penthièvre and a grandson of French king Louis Philippe I and of Brazilian Emperor Pedro I. Declining a proposal to marry into the Brazilian royal family, he chose a naval career and fathered two children without marrying. Prince Pierre was an officer in the Union and French Navies and a global traveler.

== Family ==
Prince Pierre d'Orléans was the son of François d'Orléans, Prince of Joinville and his wife, Princess Francisca of Brazil. On his father's side, he was the grandson of the French king Louis Philippe I. On his mother's side he was the grandson of Pedro I & IV, Emperor of Brazil and King of Portugal and the Algarves, after whom he was named.

Princess Françoise of Orléans (14 August 1844 – 28 October 1925), the older sister of Prince Pierre d'Orléans, is an ancestor of the three Orléanist pretenders to the throne of France since 1926: Jean III (her son), Henri VI and Henri VII. Pierre d'Orléans also had a younger sister who was stillborn (30 October 1849).

Although he never married, Prince Pierre d'Orléans had two children with Angélique Marie Augustine Lebesgue (d. 1881), a married woman:

- Jeanne Angelique Marie Lebesgue (24 December 1879 – after 1903), who in 1903 would marry the Marquis Jean de Gouy d'Arsy, son of Count Antonin de Gouy d'Arsy and Wilhelmine (Minna) de Löwenthal
- Pierre Fernand Eugène Lebesgue (12 July 1881 – 23 September 1962), who in 1941 would marry Yvonne Patrigean

== Life ==
=== From France to exile ===
Born in the Château de Saint-Cloud in 1845, Prince Pierre was expelled from France with his family when the Revolution overthrowing his grandfather, King Louis Philippe I, broke out in 1848. Prince Pierre had a happy childhood as a refugee in England with most of the other members of the House of Orléans, despite the uncertainty of life in exile. The education of Prince Pierre, his sister and cousins was overseen by his father in England and organized at first by a tutor. In 1859 Prince Pierre and his cousin, Prince Ferdinand, Duke of Alençon, left for Scotland to study at the prestigious Royal High School in Edinburgh.

=== Brazilian marriage proposal ===
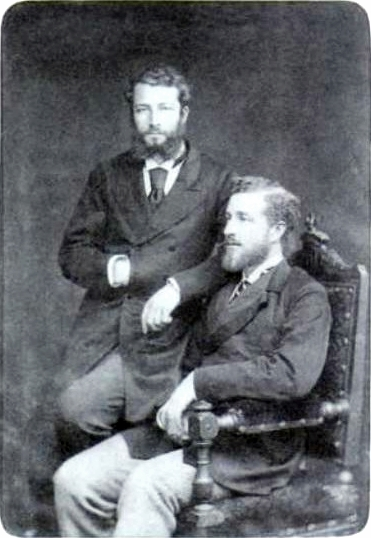
The Duke of Penthièvre and his cousin Prince Ludwig August

At the beginning of the 1860s the Emperor of Brazil, Pedro II, sought to marry his daughters, Princesses Isabel and Leopoldina, to ensure his succession. Turning to his European relatives, the emperor asked his sister Princess Francisca and her husband to advise him on young princes who could marry his daughters. From the names provided by the Joinvilles, he selected Prince Pierre and Prince Philippe, Count of Flanders as potential husbands for his daughters. For the emperor the two men offered the benefit of belonging, respectively, to the French and Belgian royal families (each a dynasty with a reputation for liberalism). Prince Pierre was also a nephew of Pedro II; his mother was the emperor's elder sister and, through her, Pierre was linked to the Brazilian crown.

The prince, however, wanted a career in the Navy and declined his uncle's offer to marry into the Brazilian royal family. The Belgian Prince Philippe refused to leave Europe to settle in the Americas, and Emperor Pedro II chose Prince Gaston d'Orléans and Prince Ludwig August of Saxe-Coburg and Gotha as his future sons-in-law.

=== In the United States ===
Desiring to follow the successful navy career of his father (who would retire as a vice-admiral), Prince Pierre expressed his wishes to his family. Despite his young age—he was sixteen at the time—his father, the Prince de Joinville, began looking for a military academy willing to receive Prince Pierre as a cadet. Thanks to the intervention of U.S. President James Buchanan, the prince was admitted to the United States Naval Academy in Annapolis, Maryland.

Arriving in the United States with his father and two cousins (Prince Philippe, Count of Paris and his younger brother Prince Robert, Duke of Chartres), Prince Pierre began his studies at the Academy on 15 October 1861. Because Annapolis was close to the front lines, it was relocated to Newport, Rhode Island, in May 1861 for the duration of the war. Prince Pierre studied the Naval Academy's relocated facilities at the Atlantic House Hotel in Newport. His cousins Philippe and Robert were appointed assistant adjutants general, with the rank of captain, in the Union Army, and served as aides to Major General George McClellan for a few months during the American Civil War.

After graduation from the academy, Prince Pierre received an honorary appointment as an acting ensign in the Union Navy on 28 May 1863 and served on the corvette USS John Adams, a training ship for midshipmen in Newport; he joined its crew while it was part of the South Atlantic Blockading Squadron, stationed off Morris Island inside Charleston Bar. Unlike his father and cousins, who left the country on 7 July 1862, he remained in the service of the United States. He was assigned as a lieutenant on the John Adams, but was not promoted to that rank. He regretfully resigned his commission on 30 May 1864 when Franco-American relations cooled with the French intervention in Mexico. He returned to France the next month.

=== Illness ===
Before resigning from the U.S. Navy Prince Pierre sailed with the John Adams to the Gulf of Mexico, where he contracted malaria. Severely affected by the disease, he was treated with heavy doses of quinine which irreversibly damaged his hearing. (Note: While journalist Dominique Paoli attributed Prince Pierre's deafness to the quinine he received to treat his malaria (as deafness is a known side-effect of quinine), historian Olivier Defrance noted that several members of the Orléans family (Princess Clémentine, Prince François, Prince Gaston, and Prince Philippe, Count of Flanders) suffered from similar ailments.)

Prince Pierre's deafness triggered an episode of depression. After returning to Europe his studies became his true passion, and he became interested in chemistry, botany, astronomy and mechanical engineering.

=== Travels ===
Since France remained closed to the Orléans family due to the post-revolution Exile Law of 28 May 1848, Prince Pierre obtained permission (with his father's help) to serve for two years as an officer of the watch on the Bartolomeu Dias, a Portuguese naval ship on a mission in the Pacific. He later traveled extensively around the world. With his relative and childhood friend, Count Ludovic de Beauvoir and Auguste Alexandre Fauvel, he embarked on a merchant ship for a tour of the Pacific from 1865 to 1867; the three traveled to Australia, Java, Siam, China, Japan and California. (Note: Although Prince Pierre did not leave a testimony of this journey, Count Ludovic de Beauvoir would later recount their adventures together in a renowned travel book: Voyage autour du monde : Java, Siam et Canton (see Sources).) Fauvel and de Beauvoir would each publish several books about their travels, and he later completed a number of other voyages.

=== Return to France ===
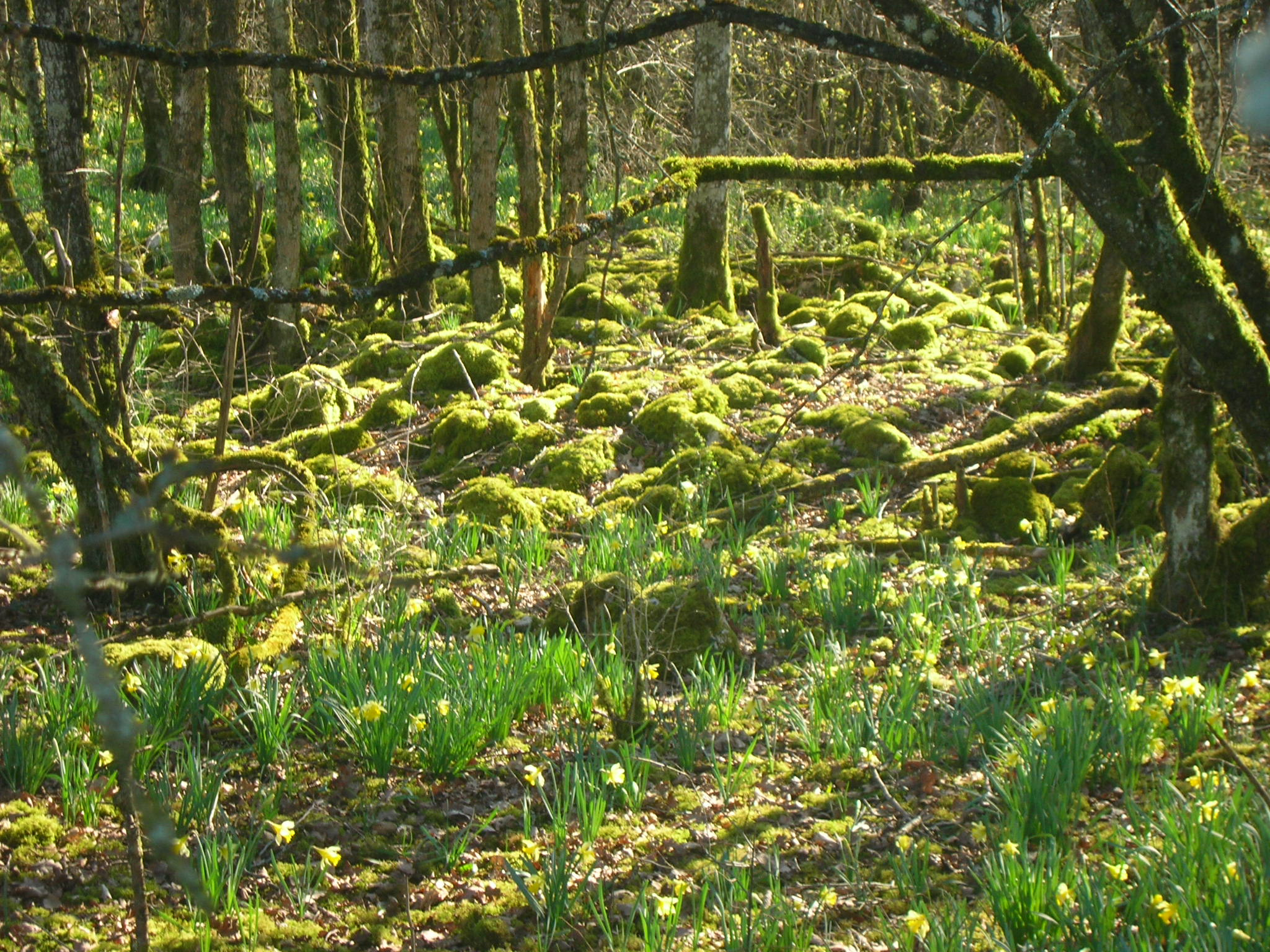
Former hunting area in the forest of Arc-en-Barrois

With the fall of the Second French Empire on 4 September 1870 Prince Pierre could return to France and become part of its Navy, which was marginally active during the Franco-Prussian War (primarily fought on land). Upon his entry into service for France, he was appointed lieutenant aboard the newly built (1870) frigate L'Océan under the command of Admiral Renault.

The prince began a romantic relationship with a young married woman, Angélique Lebesgue. He fathered two children with her: Jeanne and Pierre Lebesgue. Prince Pierre raised Jeanne and Pierre in his successive residences on Avenue d'Antin (today Avenue Franklin D. Roosevelt) and Boulevard Haussmann in Paris. Despite the scandal caused by his relationship with Lebesgue, Prince Pierre remained close to his family and regularly visited his sister, Princess Françoise. Fond of hunting, the prince also frequented the forest of Arc-en-Barrois (a wilderness area in the Chaumont Arrondissement owned by him and his family, with a large game population).

=== Later life ===
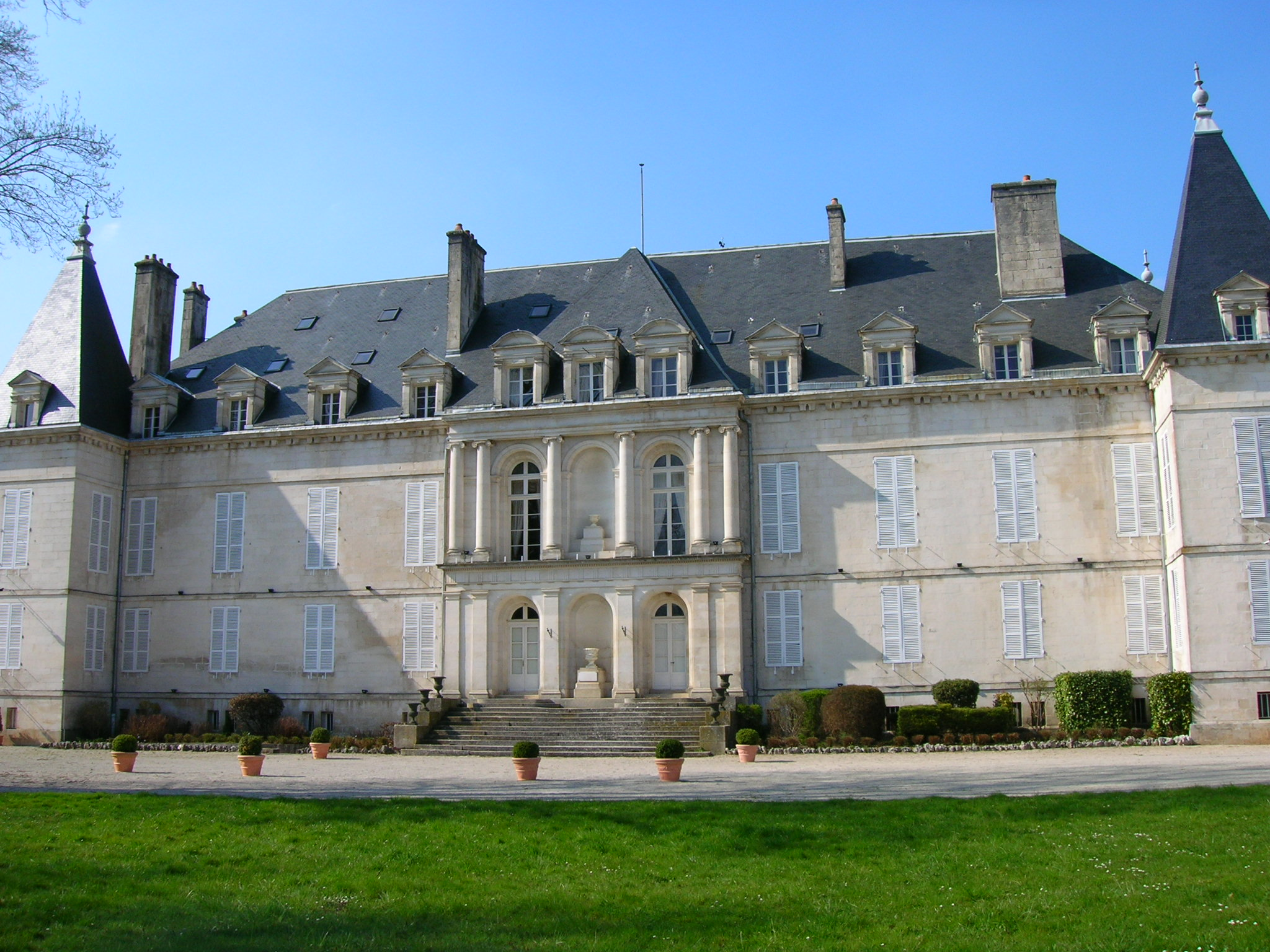
Front of the Château d'Arc-en-Barrois

In 1883, a new French law concerning princes of former ruling houses obligated Prince Pierre to leave the Navy. Despite this, he offered his château at Arc-en-Barrois (inherited after his father's death in 1900) to the French army during World War I. The Château d'Arc-en-Barrois was used as a military hospital for wounded soldiers, particularly those injured during the Verdun and Argonne campaigns.

In 1910 he visited England as a guest at the funeral of Edward VII.

The prince died a bachelor in 1919 and, with no legitimate heirs, passed the Château d'Arc-en-Barrois to his nephew Prince Jean, Duke of Guise (claimant King of the French as Jean III). Prince Pierre is buried in the Royal Chapel of Dreux, France.

== Ancestry ==
Ancestors of Pierre, Duke of Penthièvre

8. Louis Philippe II, Duke of Orléans
4. Louis Philippe I of France
9. Louise Marie Adélaïde de Bourbon
2. François, Prince of Joinville
10. Ferdinand I of the Two Sicilies
5. Maria Amalia of Naples and Sicily
11. Maria Carolina of Austria
1. Prince Pierre, Duke of Penthièvre
12. John VI of Portugal and Brazil
6. Pedro I of Brazil and IV of Portugal
13. Carlota Joaquina of Spain
3. Princess Francisca of Brazil
14. Francis II, Holy Roman Emperor
7. Maria Leopoldina of Austria
15. Maria Theresa of Naples and Sicily
