= Shahen Nikolay Petrosyan =

Shahen Nikolay Petrosyan (17 February 1912 – March 14, 1999) was a lawyer, doctor of law, professor, honored lawyer of the Armenian SSR, Chairman of the Supreme Court of Armenia, Dean of the Faculty of Law of Yerevan State University, Head of Department of the History of the State and Law.

== Biography ==
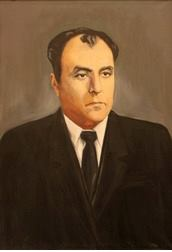

Shahen Petrosyan was born on February 17, 1912, in the village of Ddmashen, in the Sevan region. Ddmashen village is one of the oldest villages in Armenia, as evidenced by the presences of the 7th century Church of St. Tadevos (the link from the wiki). Upon graduation from high school, Petrosyan continued his studies in Yerevan and in 1933entered the Yerevan State University Department of Law, graduating in 1937. Combining studies he worked as the director of the Boarding School N13 after Ernest Thelman, from 1934 to 1936. Upon graduation Petrosyan started his career as a lawyer and worked first as a prosecutor in the Prosecutor's Office of the Republic and later as a deputy chief of civil affairs and the prosecutor of Molotovo district of Yerevan from 1940 to 1943. At the age of 38, he was elected as chairman of the Supreme Court of Armenia. Petrosyan earned the degree of Candidate of Legal Sciences in 1949, in Moscow, and moved on to teaching, serving as a lecturer, associate professor, head of department and dean. In 1972 he received his doctorate in jurisprudence followed by his designation as full professor in 1974.

Petrosyan served as the dean of the Faculty of Law from 1974 to 1978 and headed the Department of the History of the Theory of state and law from 1977 to 1985. As a professor, he taught at the Faculty of "History of State and Law of foreign countries" and "Public Law of the socialist countries." He was an active participant in the drafting of legislative acts of the USSR and for 25 years continuously led the work of the Scientific and Methodological Council of State and Law Society, "Knowledge" of the Armenian SSR. Additionally he served as chairman of the Faculty Academic Council academic degree of Scientific and Methodological Council of Higher and Secondary Education. In 1982 he was awarded the title of Honored Lawyer of the Armenian SSR and received a medal from the Supreme Council of the Armenian SSR. On December 14, 2012, a scientific conference of the faculty of Yerevan State University Faculty of Law was conducted dedicated to the 100th anniversary of Shahen N. Petrosyan. In 2013 proceedings of the conference were published in the "Publisher of YSU."

== Published works ==
1. "Constitutional Development of the Soviet State in Armenia", 1958.
2. "The Constitution of the Armenian SSR and its Historical Development", 1982.
3. "The Public Authorities of the Developed Socialism", 1982.
4. "The History and Law of Foreign Countries", 1986.
5. "Memoriam" 1994.
