= Shosh Bedrosian =

American–Israeli journalist

Shoshana Bedrosian
- שוש בדרוסיאן

Israeli Government Spokesperson
- Incumbent
- Assumed office September 25, 2025

Personal details
- Education: Ithaca College (BA)

Shoshana Bedrosian (Hebrew: שוש בדרוסיאן) is an American and Israeli journalist currently serving as the Israeli Government Spokesperson and Communications Specialist for Foreign Media in the Office of the Prime Minister of Israel since September 2025.

== Early life and education ==
Bedrosian graduated from Somers High School in Lincolndale, New York in 2015. She later played on the varsity women's soccer team at Ithaca College, graduating in 2019 with a degree in TVR/journalism.

== Career ==
Bedrosian previously served as a reporter for News 12 Connecticut, CBS News New York and The Jerusalem Post.

On September 25, 2025, Bedrosian was appointed Israeli Government Spokesperson ahead of Prime Minister Benjamin Netanyahu's trip to the US for the United Nations General Assembly (UNGA). Bedrosian's appointment was expedited and approved without a full tender process, on the grounds of “special trust relations”.

Bedrosian served as Israeli Government Spokesperson during the Gaza War ceasefire negotiations.
