= Pete (given name) =

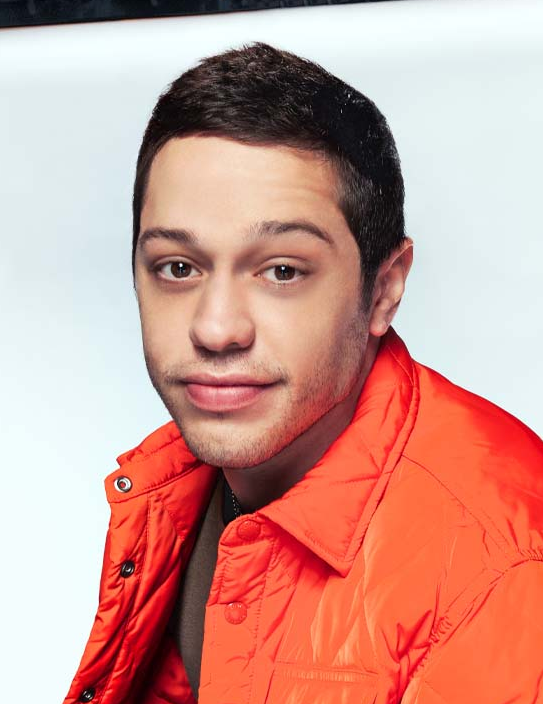
- comedian Pete Davidson
- Pronunciation: /piːt/
- Gender: Male

Other names
- Related names: Peter, Petey

Pete is a masculine given name. Notable people with the name include:

== People ==
- Pete Accetturo, American YouTuber and voice actor
- Pete Alonso (born 1994), American baseball player
- Pete Appleton (1904–1974), American baseball player
- Pete Buttigieg (born 1982), American politician
- Pete Berezney (1923–2008), American football player
- Pete Burns (1959–2016), British singer, member of the band Dead or Alive
- Pete D'Alonzo (1929–2001), American football player
- Pete Davidson (born 1993), American comedian
- Pete Docter (born 1968), American animator, film director and producer
- Pete Elverum, American politician
- Pete Fairbanks (born 1993), American baseball player
- Pete Fountain (1930–2016), American clarinet player
- Pete Gardner (born 1964), American actor
- Pete Gudauskas (1916–2003), American football player
- Pete Ham (1947–1975), Welsh singer, songwriter and guitarist, member of the rock band Badfinger
- Pete Hamill (1935–2020), American journalist and author
- Pete Hamilton (1942–2017), American NASCAR driver
- Pete Hegseth (born 1980), United States Secretary of Defense
- Pete Holmes, (born 1979), American comedian
- Pete Loeffler, American singer-songwriter and musician, member of the rock band Chevelle
- Pete Maki, American baseball coach
- Pete Maravich (1948-1988), American basketball player
- Pete Mikolajewski (born 1943), American football player
- Pete Murray (Australian singer-songwriter) (born 1969), Australian singer-songwriter
- Pete Murray (DJ) (born 1925), British radio and television presenter and actor
- Pete Nice (born 1967), American rapper
- Pete Perini (1928–2008), American football player
- Pete Postlethwaite (1946–2011), English actor
- Pete Price (born 1946), British radio presenter
- Pete Ricketts (born 1964), American businessman
- Pete Rose (1941–2024), American professional baseball player and manager
- Pete Sampras (born 1971), American tennis player
- Pete Seeger (1919–2014), American folk singer
- Pete Shufelt (born 1969), American football player
- Pete Smith (disambiguation), multiple people
- Pete Townshend (born 1945), English guitarist, singer, songwriter (The Who)
- Pete Trgovich, American basketball player
- Pete Walker (baseball), American baseball player and coach
- Pete Wentz (born 1979), bassist of the band Fall Out Boy
- Pete Werner (born 1999), American football player
- Pete Woodworth (born 1988), American baseball coach

== Fictional characters ==
- Pete Beale, on the BBC soap opera EastEnders
- Pete Campbell, on the American television series Mad Men
- Pete Miller, on the American television series The Office
- Pete Dinglewood, protagonist of Step Closer, the first story in the book Five Nights at Freddy's Step Closer.
- Play-Doh Pete, the mascot of Play-Doh compound who was around from 1960 to 2002
- Pete 'Maverick' Mitchell, in Top Gun
- Pete (Disney), an anthropomorphic cartoon character in Disney media
- Pete the Cat, a cat from the "Pete the Cat" series of books
- Pete the Pup, from the Our Gang series of comedies
- Pete, in the movie Shaun of the Dead
- Pete & Pete, the title characters of The Adventures of Pete & Pete, an American children's television series
- Old Puffer Pete, in the TV series Chuggington
- Pete Crane, a construction vehicle in Putt-Putt Enters the Race
- Pete, the freight engine in The Little Engine That Could
- Pete Malloy, one of the two main characters in the TV series Adam-12
- Peter "Pete" Martino, one of the main characters in the CBS series Ghosts
- Pete McGee, a character from The Ghost and Molly McGee
- Pete, the title character of Pete the Tramp, an American comic strip published from 1932 to 1963
- Pete Wisdom, from Marvel Comics
- Skinny Pete, one of Jesse Pinkman's friends in Breaking Bad
- Stinky Pete, a character of Woody's Roundup and the main antagonist of Toy Story 2
- Cactus Pete, the cameo husband of Cactus Polly on Oswald
- Cordwood Pete, younger brother of American folk legend Paul Bunyan
- Pete, a character in the Animal Crossing video game series
- Pete, the title character of Power Pete, a video game
- Pete, a character from Total Drama: The Ridonculous Race
- Pete Wheeler, the main character in the Backyard Sports game series
