= Peter (given name) =

Masculine given name

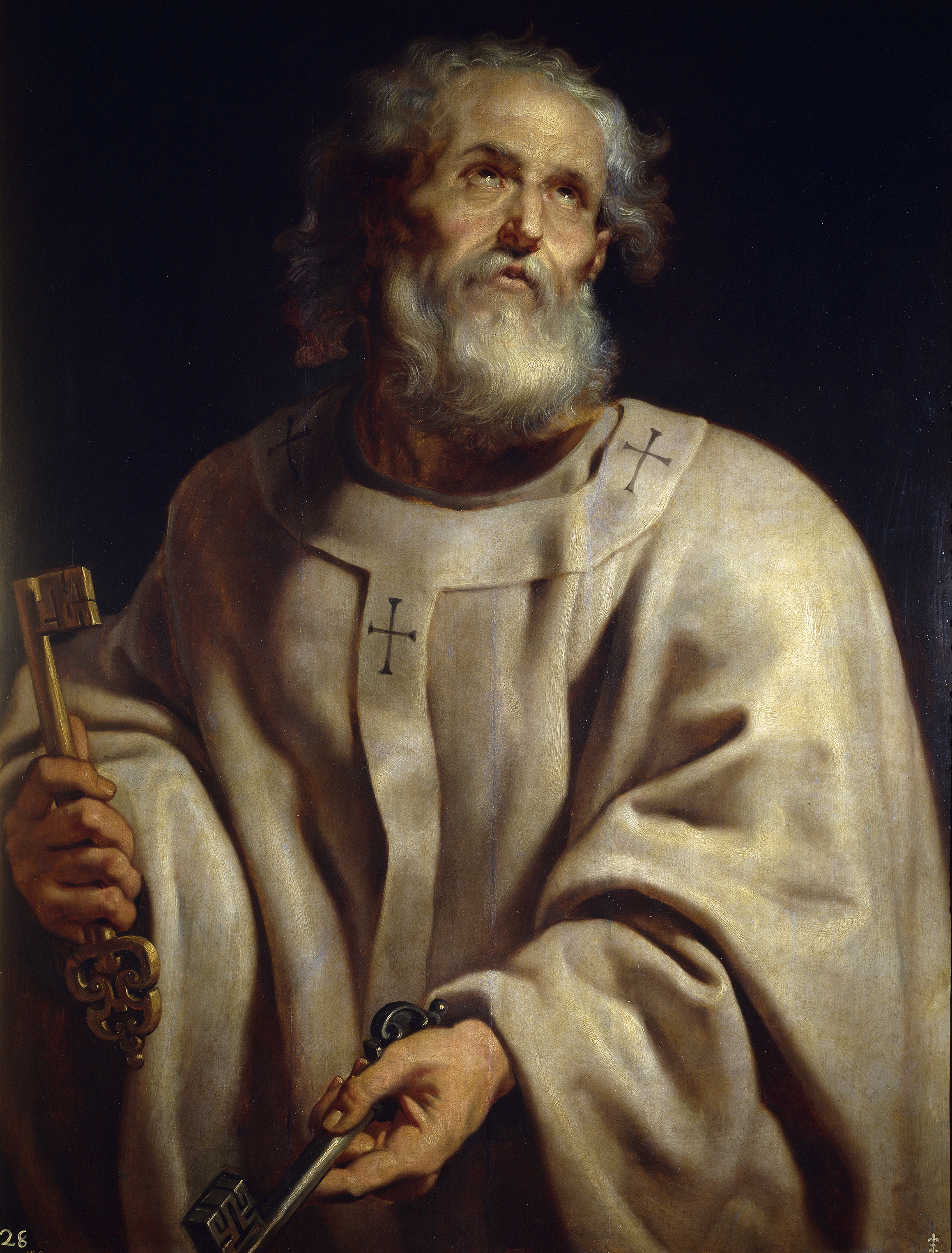
- Saint Peter by Peter Paul Rubens (1610–1612)
- Pronunciation: English: /ˈpiːtər/ PEE-tər; Czech: [ˈpɛtr̩] Danish: [ˈpʰe̝ˀtɐ] Dutch: [ˈpeːtər] German: [ˈpeːtɐ] Slovak: [ˈpeter] Swedish: [ˈpěːtɛr]
- Gender: Male

Origin
- Language: Greek
- Meaning: Stone/Rock

Other names
- Related names: Petter; Pjetër; Pater; Pete; Petey/Petie; Peoter; Pearce; Petero; Per; Peta; Petra; Pierce; Pierre; Pedro; Pier; Piers; Pieter; Pietro; Peadar; Pere; Kepa; Peru; Peio; Boutros; Peterson

Peter is a common masculine given name. It is derived directly from Greek Πέτρος, Petros (an invented, masculine form of Greek petra, the word for "rock" or "stone"), which itself was a translation of Aramaic Kefa ("stone, rock"), the new name Jesus gave to apostle Simon bar Jonah. An Old English variant is Piers.

== In other languages ==
The following names can be interpreted as Peter in English.

- Afrikaans: Pieter, Petrus
- Albanian: Pjetër, Për
- Amharic: ቡትሮስ ("Boutros")
- Arabic: بطرس (Boutros), بيار ("Pierre", mainly in Lebanon), بيتر ("Peter", exact transcription)
- Aragonese: Pietro, Pero, Piero, Pier
- Armenian: Պետրոս (Bedros in the Western dialect, Petros in the Eastern dialect)
- Assamese: পিটাৰ
- Asturian: Pedru
- Azerbaijani: Pyotr
- Basque: Peru, Pello (diminutive), Pedro, Piarres, Harkaitz (Means "Rock" in Basque), Arkaitz, Petri (Biblical), Kepa (neologism)
- Belarusian: Пётр (Piotr), Пятро (Piatro), Пятрусь (Piatruś)
- Bengali: পিটার (Piṭār), পিতর (Pitôr)
- Breton: Pêr
- Bulgarian: Петър (Petar), Пере, Перо (Pere, Pero), Петьо, Петю (Petyo, Petyu), Пеньо, Пеню, Пенко (Penyo, Penyu, Penko), Пельо, Пелю, Пелко (Pelyo, Pelyu, Pelko), Пешо (Pesho); Камен (Kamen) ("kamen, kamək" in Bulgarian means: stone)
- Catalan: Pere
- Cebuano: Pedro
- Standard Chinese:
  - Protestant: 彼得 (Bǐdé)
  - Catholic: 伯多祿 (Bóduōlù)
- Coptic: ⲡⲉⲧⲣⲟⲥ (Ṗeṭros)
- Cornish: Peder
- Croatian: Petar, Pero, Periša, Perica, Pera, Pejo
- Czech: Petr, Péťa (diminutive)
- Danish: Peter, Peder, Per, Peer, Pelle
- Dutch: Pieter, Peter, Piet, Pier (Note: The form "Peer" also occurs, albeit less commonly.)
- Emiliano-Romagnolo: Pédor
- Esperanto: Petro
- Estonian: Peeter, Peep, Peetrus, Pavo, Peedo
- Faroese: Pætur, Petur, Per
- Filipino: Pedro, Pedring (diminutive)
- Frisian: Piter, Pier
- Finnish: Pietari, Pekka, Petri, Petteri
- French: Pierre (Note: the word for stone in French is also "pierre".)
- Galician: Pedro
- Georgian: პეტრე (Petre)
- German: Peter (Note: The form "Peer" also occurs, albeit less commonly.)
- Greek: Πέτρος (Petros)
- Guarani: Peru
- Gujarati: પીટર (Pīṭar)
- Gungbe: Pita
- Haitian Creole: Pierre (pronounced "Pyè")
- Hausa: Bitrus
- Hindi: Pathrus, पीटर (Pīṭar)
- Hebrew: פטרוס (Petros), פטר (literally Peter)
- Hungarian: Péter; Petya, Peti (diminutive)
- Icelandic: Pétur, Pési (diminutive)
- Indonesian: Petrus, Peter
- Irish: Piaras, Pierce, Peadar
- Italian: Pietro, Pier, Piero (Note: the word for stone in Italian is "pietra".)
- Japanese:
  - Protestant: ピーター (Pītā)
  - Catholic: ペトロ (Petoro), ペテロ (Petero)
  - Biblical contexts: ペトロス (Petorosu)
- Kazakh: Петр (Petr)
- Khmer: Pathra
- Konkani: Pedru
- Korean: 베드로 (Bedro); less commonly, 페트루스 (Petrus); 피터 (Pitə)
- Lao: ເປໂຕ (Peot)
- Latin: Petrus
- Latvian: Pēteris
- Lingala: Petelo
- Lithuanian: Petras
- Lombard: Peder
- Low German: Petrus
- Luganda: Petero
- Luxembourgish: Pit, Pier
- Macedonian: Петар (Petar), Питер (Piter), Петре (Petre), Перо (Pero), Пере (Pere), Перица (Perica)
- Malagasy: Petera
- Malayalam: പത്രോസ് (Patrōs), പീരി ("Peeri" from Pierre)
- Maltese: Pietru
- Manx: Peddyr
- Māori: Petera, Pita
- Marathi: पेत्र (Petrə), पेद्रो (Pedro)
- Mongolian: Петр (Pyetr)
- Montenegrin: Петар (Petar), Перо (Pero)
- Nepali: पत्रुस (Patrus)
- Norman: Pierre
- Northern Sami: Pekka, Piera, Biera, Bierril, Bierža, Biehtár
- Norwegian: Peter, Petter, Per, Pelle, Peder
- Nahuatl: Pedro
- Occitan: Pèire, Pèir, Pèr
- Persian: Pedros, Pedrush
- Polish: Piotr. Diminutives/hypocoristics include Piotrek, Piotruś, and Piotrunio. Piotr has several name days in Poland.
- Portuguese: Pedro, Pêro (old Portuguese) (Note: The word for stone in Portuguese is "pedra".)
- Punjabi: ਪਤਰਸਨੂੰ (Patarasanū)
- Quechua: Pidru, Rumi
- Romanian: Petru, Petre, Petrică (diminutive), Petrișor (diminutive)
- Russian: Пётр (Pyotr), Питер (Piter), Петя (Petya) (diminutive), Петруха (Petrukha) (colloquial)
- Samoan: Petelo
- Sardinian: Pedru, Perdu, Pretu
- Scottish Gaelic: Peadair
- Serbian: Петар (Petar), Петер (Peter), Перо (Pero), Пера (Pera), Перица (Perica), Периша (Periša)
- Sicilian: Pietru
- Silesian: Pyjter, Piter
- Sinhala: Peduru
- Slovak: Peter, Peťo
- Slovene: Peter
- Spanish: Pedro
- Swahili: Petero
- Swedish: Peter, Petter, Peder, Per, Pehr, Pär, Pelle, Pälle
- Syriac: ܦܛܪܘܣ (Peṭrus)
- Tagalog: Pedro
- Tamil: Pethuru, Raayappar (in biblical contexts)
- Telugu: పేతురు (Peturu)
- Thai: ปีเตอร์ (RTGS: Pitoe), เปโตร (Petro, in biblical contexts)
- Tongan: Pita
- Tswana: Petere, Pitoro
- Turkish: Kaya (rock), Kayahan (khan of rocks); Petrus, Petros (in biblical contexts)
- Ukrainian: Петро (Petro), ~~Пітер (Piter),~~ Петрик (Petryk) (diminutive), Петрусь (Petrus) (diminutive)
- Urdu: پتھر (Rock) or پیٹر (lit. Peter)
- Uzbek: Pyotr (as in Russian)
- Venetian: Piero
- Vietnamese: Phê-rô
- Võro: Piitre
- Welsh: Pedr
- West Frisian: Petrus
- Yoruba: Peteru
- Zulu: Petru

== See also ==
- Pete (nickname), a list of people (excluding Peters)
- Pete (given name), a list of people (with the given name)
- Petros (disambiguation)
- Pierce (disambiguation)
- List of people with given name Piotr
- List of people with given name Pyotr
