= François d'Orléans, Prince of Joinville =

French prince; third son of Louis Philippe I (1818-1900)

François d'Orléans
- Prince of Joinville
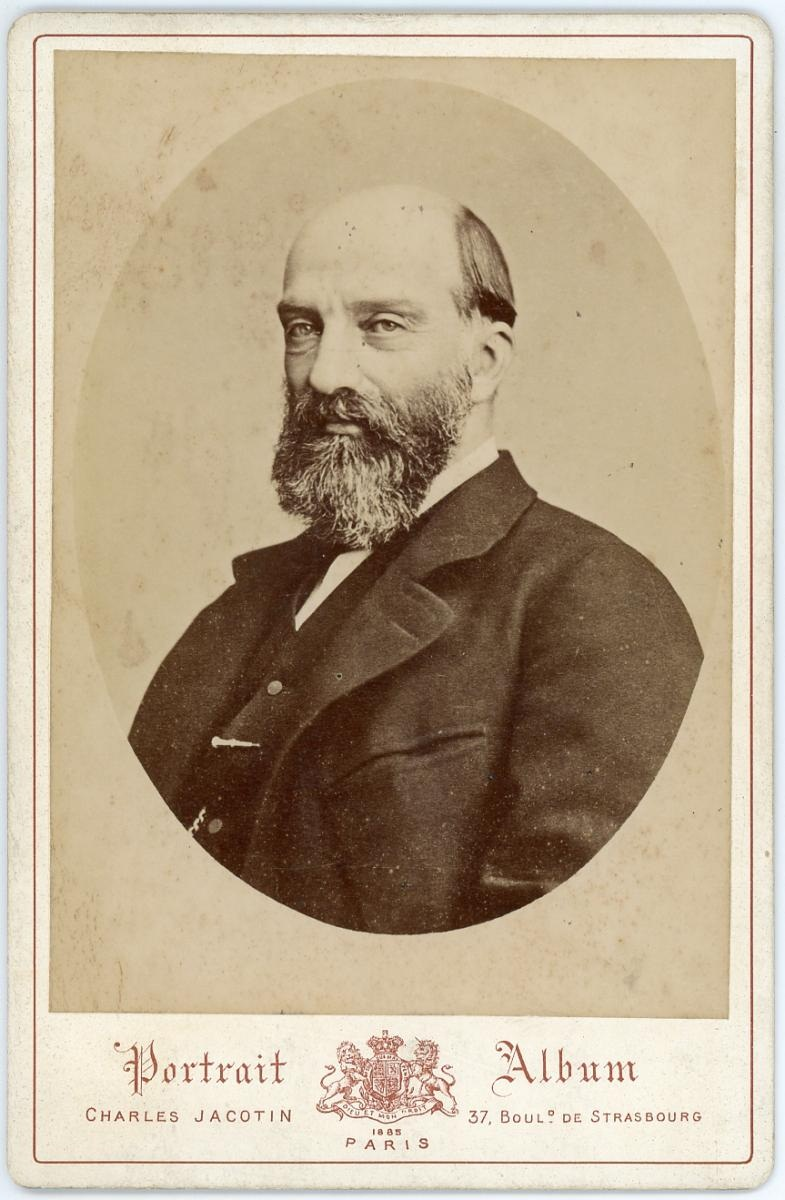
- Born: 14 August 1818; Château de Neuilly, Neuilly-sur-Seine, France
- Died: 16 June 1900 (aged 81); Paris, France
- Spouse: Princess Francisca of Brazil (m. 1843; died 1898)
- Issue: Françoise, Duchess of Chartres; Pierre, Duke of Penthièvre
Names
- François-Ferdinand-Philippe-Louis-Marie d'Orléans
- House: Orléans
- Father: Louis Philippe I
- Mother: Maria Amalia of Naples and Sicily

François d'Orléans, Prince de Joinville (14 August 1818 – 16 June 1900) was the third son of Louis Philippe, King of the French, and his wife Maria Amalia of Naples and Sicily. An admiral of the French Navy, François was famous for bringing the remains of Napoleon from Saint Helena to France, as well as a talented artist, with 35 known watercolours. He married Princess Francisca of Brazil, daughter of Emperor Pedro I and sister of Emperor Pedro II. The dowry received by François upon the marriage became the Brazilian city of Joinville.

François and Francisca's grandson Jean went on to become the Orléanist claimant to the extinct French throne, a claim passed on to his son, grandson and now great-grandson Jean, Count of Paris, current Orléanist claimant to the French crown.

== Early life and military career ==
He was born François-Ferdinand-Philippe-Louis-Marie d'Orléans at the Château de Neuilly, in Neuilly-sur-Seine, France. Educated for the navy, he was commissioned lieutenant in 1836. His first conspicuous service was at the Bombardment of San Juan de Ulúa, in November 1838, commanding the corvette Créole, when he headed a landing party and took the Mexican general Mariano Arista prisoner at Veracruz.

He was known as Hadji to his relatives, and his aunt Adelaide allegedly said: "He is like me and my father. That is why I prefer him to my other nephews."

The Prince was promoted to captain of the frigate La Belle Poule, and in 1840 was entrusted with bringing the remains of Napoleon from Saint Helena to France.

== Marriage to Francisca of Brazil ==
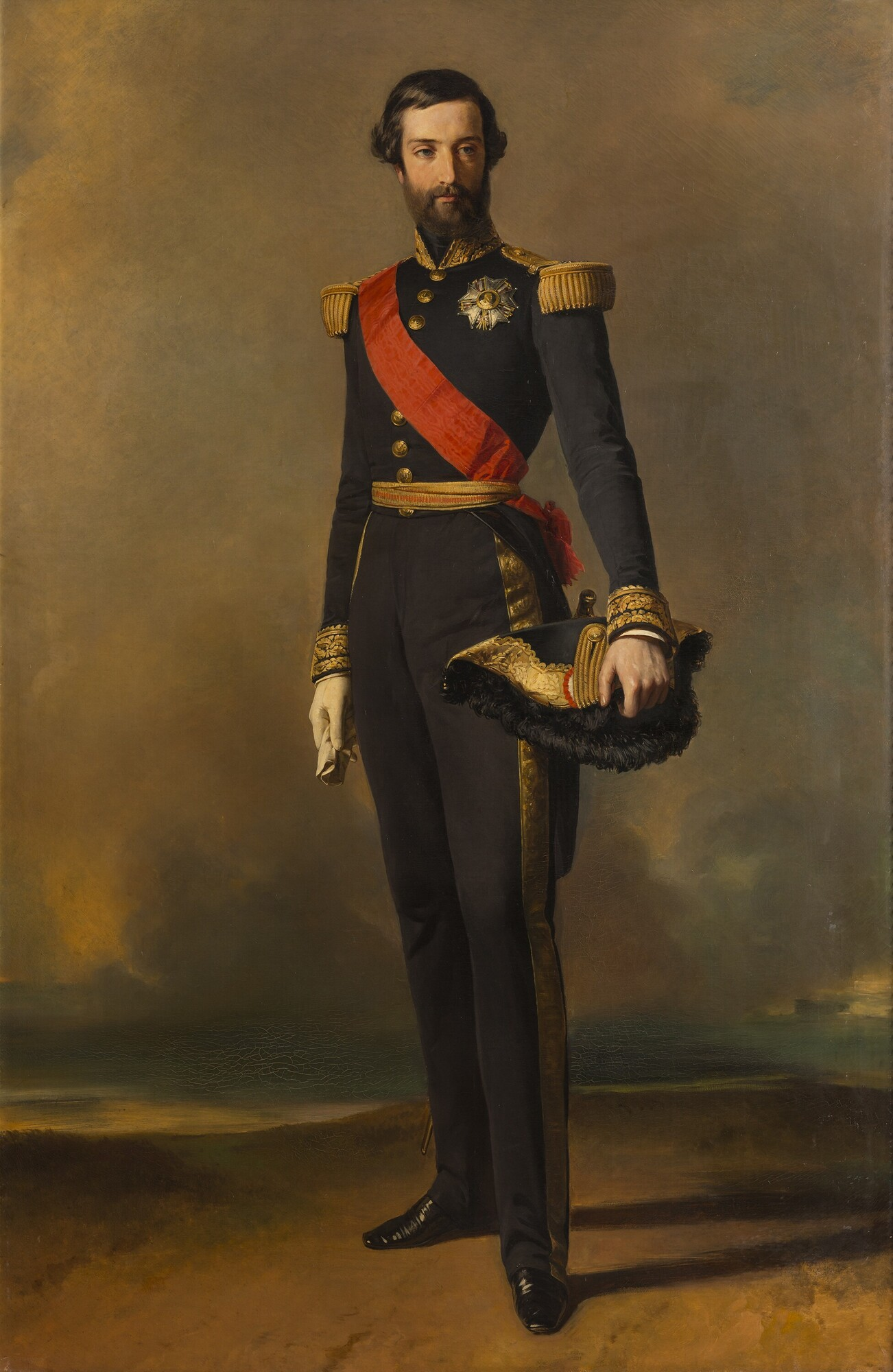
Portrait by Franz Xaver Winterhalter, 1843

In 1838, François had made his first trip to Brazil, where he had been warmly hosted by Emperor Pedro II, son of Emperor Pedro I of Brazil and Archduchess Leopoldina of Austria, a Habsburg. During his time in the Brazilian court, François met Princess Francisca, Pedro's younger daughter, his first cousin once removed, then 14 years old.

In 1840, François again stopped in Brazil for two weeks on his way back from St. Helena, where he had headed the expedition entrusted with bringing the remains of Napoleon from Saint Helena to France. Three years later, François headed once again to Rio de Janeiro, in order to marry Princess Francisca. They married in that city on 1 May 1843.

François received as dowry an area of over 580 km^{2} in the South of Brazil, in the state of Santa Catarina, until then called Colônia Dona Francisca after its owner, the newly-wed princess, sister to the emperor. The area, near the coast and devoid of any populational settlements, therefore became the Brazilian part of the lands of the Prince of Joinville.

== Exile and sale of the lands of Joinville ==
In 1844 he conducted naval operations against Morocco, bombarding Tangier and occupying Mogador, and was rewarded with the rank of vice-admiral. In the following year he published in the Revue des deux mondes an article on the deficiencies of the French Navy which attracted considerable attention.

In 1848, François' father, King Louis Philippe, was deposed as the monarchy was abolished in France and the French Second Republic instaurated. Like his parents and siblings, François nominally lost all his properties and lands in France, including the French lands of the principality of Joinville, and hastily went with his wife and family to exile in England.

Having taken refuge with his family at Claremont, and with the Brazilian lands of Joinville as his only remaining property, François decided to make profits off those that were last remnants of his former principality. With the assistance of Hamburg Senator Christian Mathias Schroeder, with whom the gains were split, parts of the lands were sold to German-speaking immigrants, who started arriving in the Brazilian Joinville on 9 March 1851 and built the first facilities in the area, including a small royal palace. The titularity of the principality was negotiated with Heinrich Ferdinand Wiese, German-speaking noble-man from Schleswig-Holstein whose family was fleeing as the Danish troops invaded their territory during the First Schleswig War. It was agreed that the transferred title could only be used by Heinrich Ferdinand or his descendants after the passing of François and Francisca, who officially kept the titles of Prince and Princess of Joinville until their death.

== Political career and service in the American Civil War ==
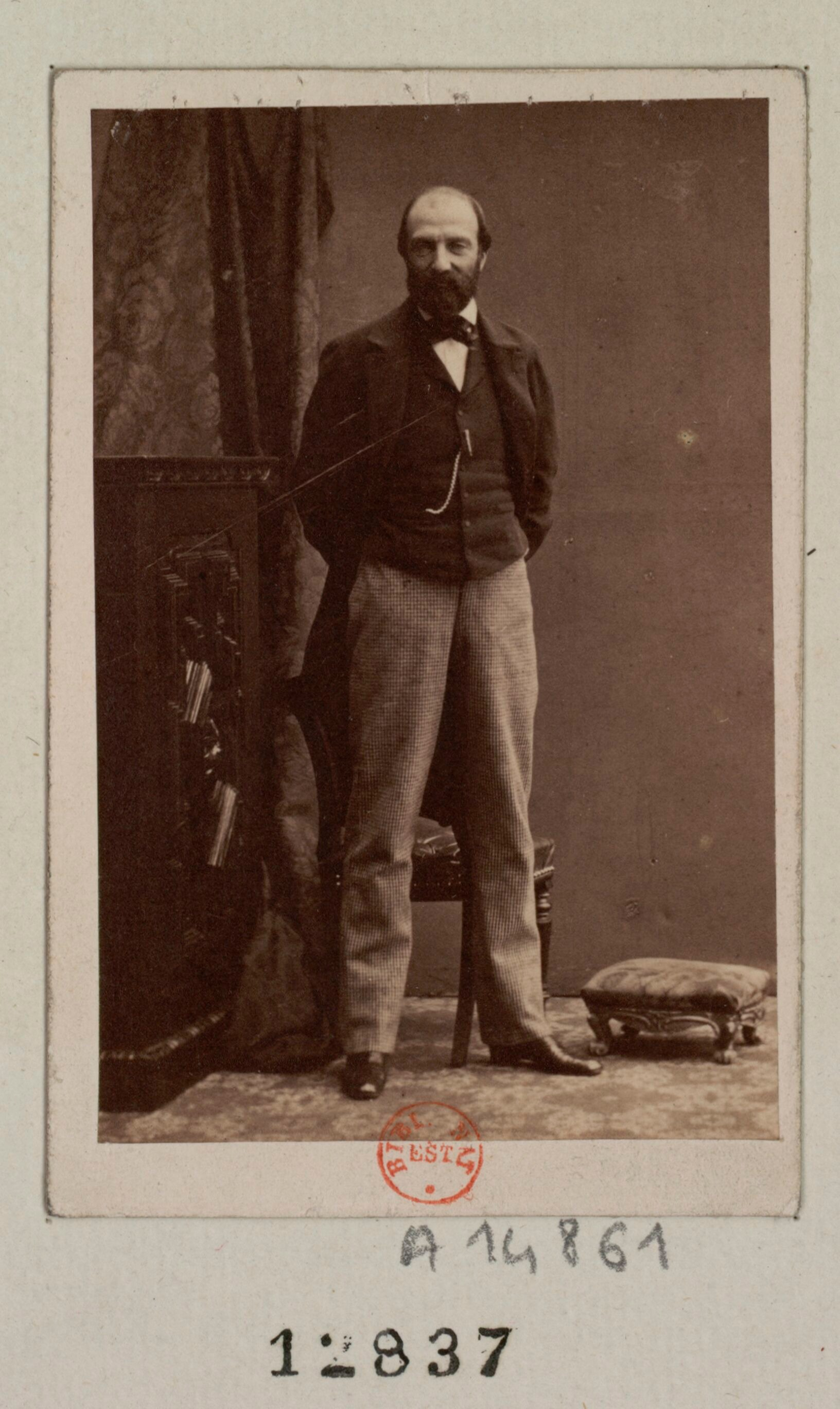
Photograph of François

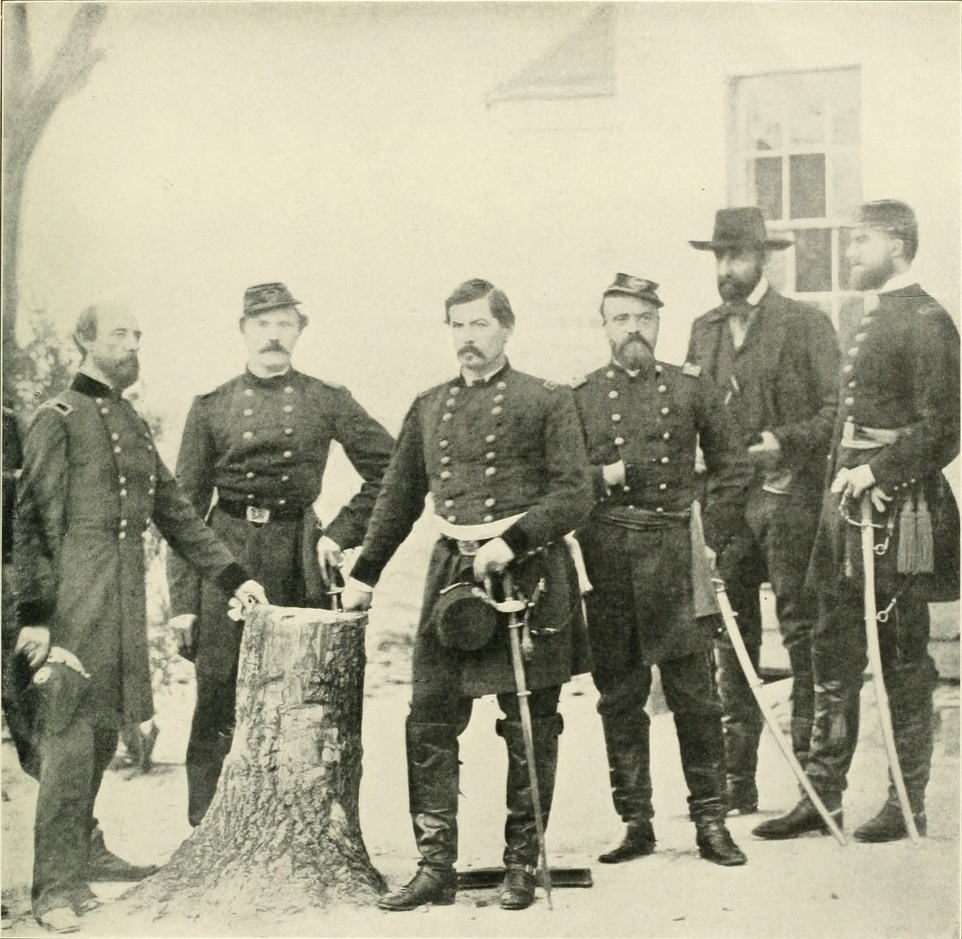
François d'Orléans (second from right) with staff and dignitaries of General McClellan (center), during the American Civil War

François was excluded from continuing a career in the Second Republic's navy. So in 1851, he announced his candidacy for the French presidential election to be held in 1852, hoping to pave the way for an eventual restoration of the monarchy. His plan to become a second "Prince-President" was preempted by the 2 December 1851 coup by which the first "Prince-President", Louis-Napoléon Bonaparte, effected his own ascension to the throne.

In 1861, upon the outbreak of the American Civil War, he went to the United States, and placed the services of his son and two of his nephews at the disposal of the government. President Lincoln appointed him and his nephews to the staff of Major General George B. McClellan. In June 1862, disagreements with the US position towards Mexico caused the prince to withdraw from the Union forces, and he returned to Europe.

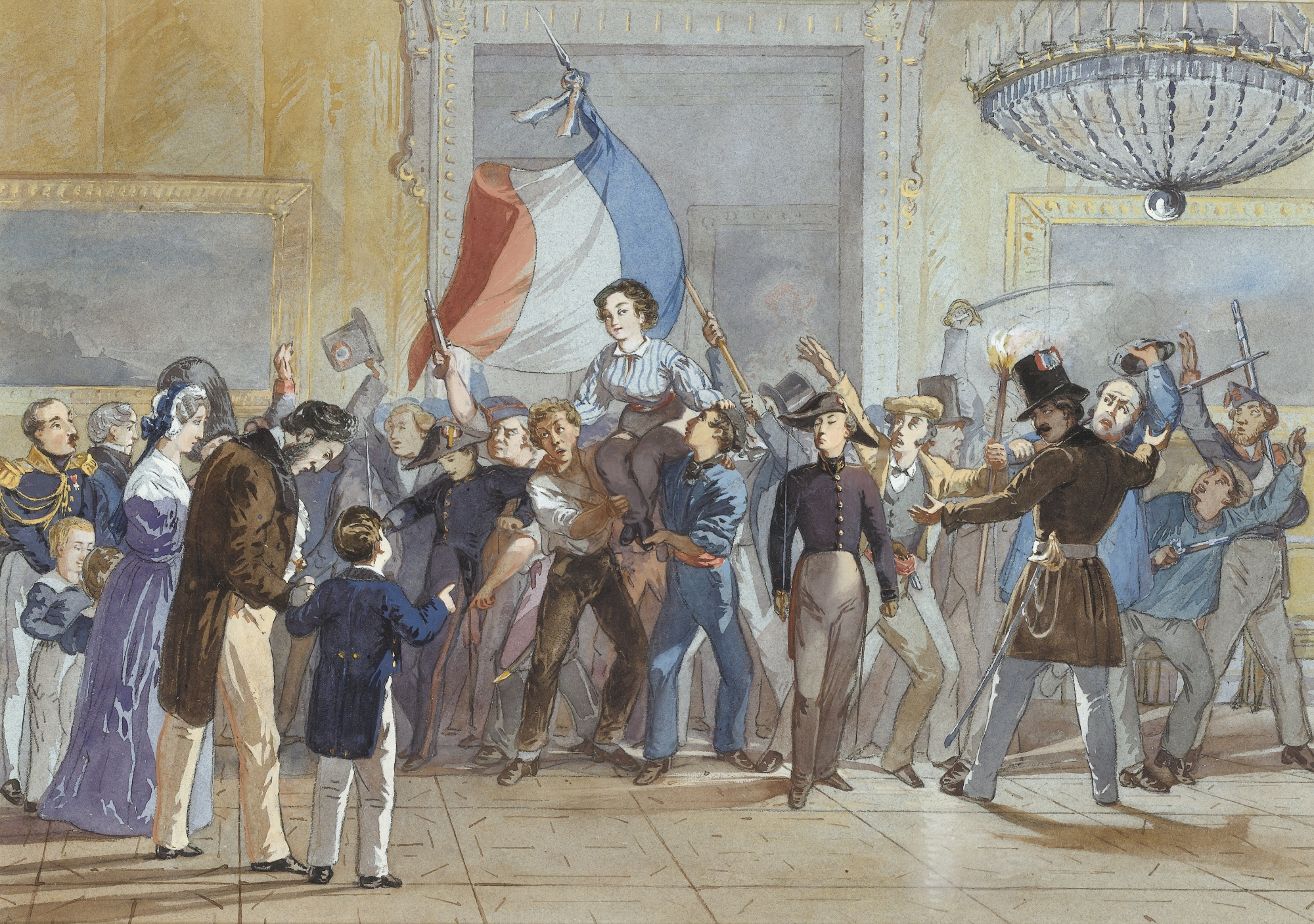
François' representation of the 1830 Revolution, contrasting with Delacroix' famous depiction of the same event (Liberty Leading the People).

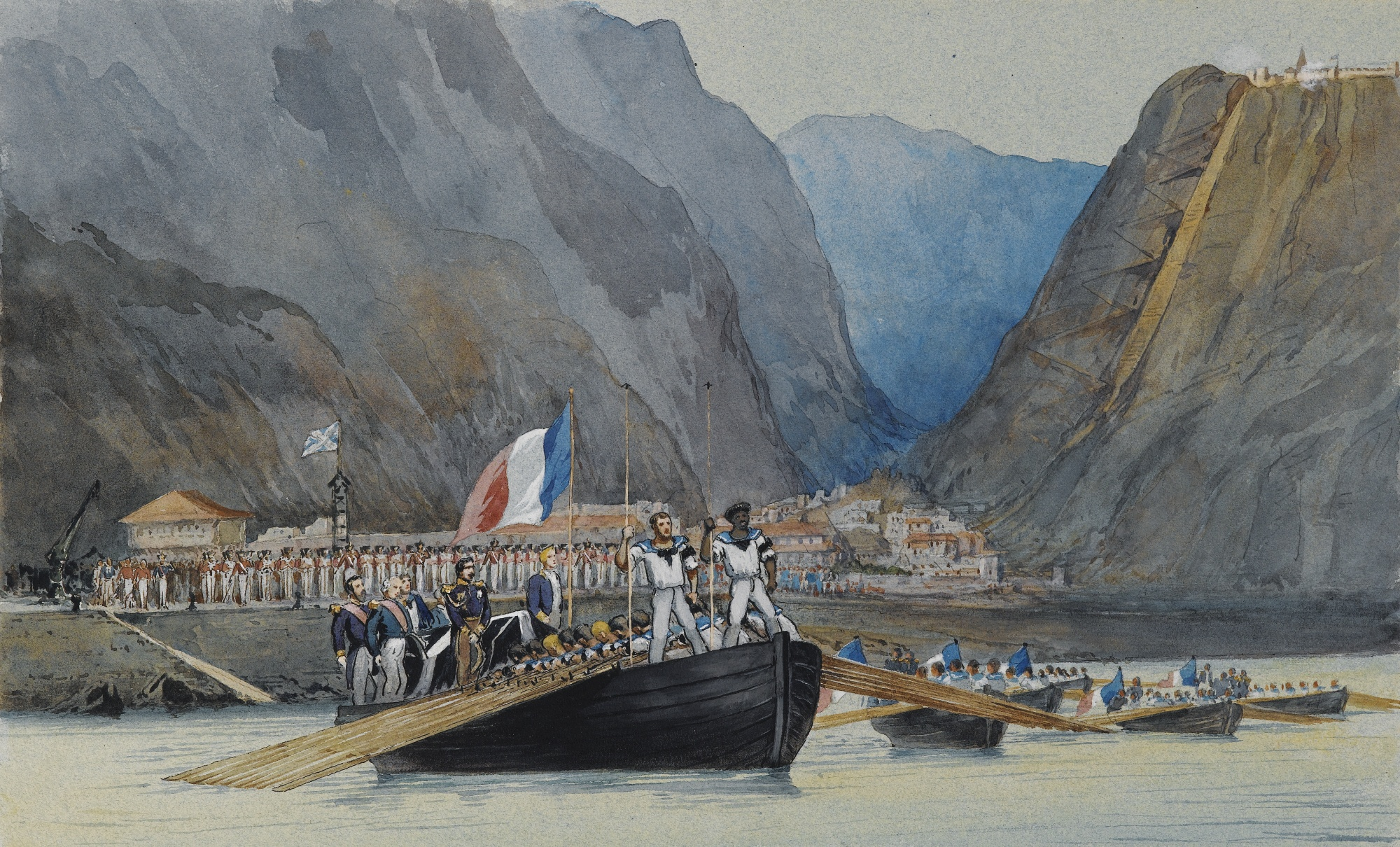
François painted his own expedition to recover the remnants of Napoleon from Saint Helena and take them back to Paris.

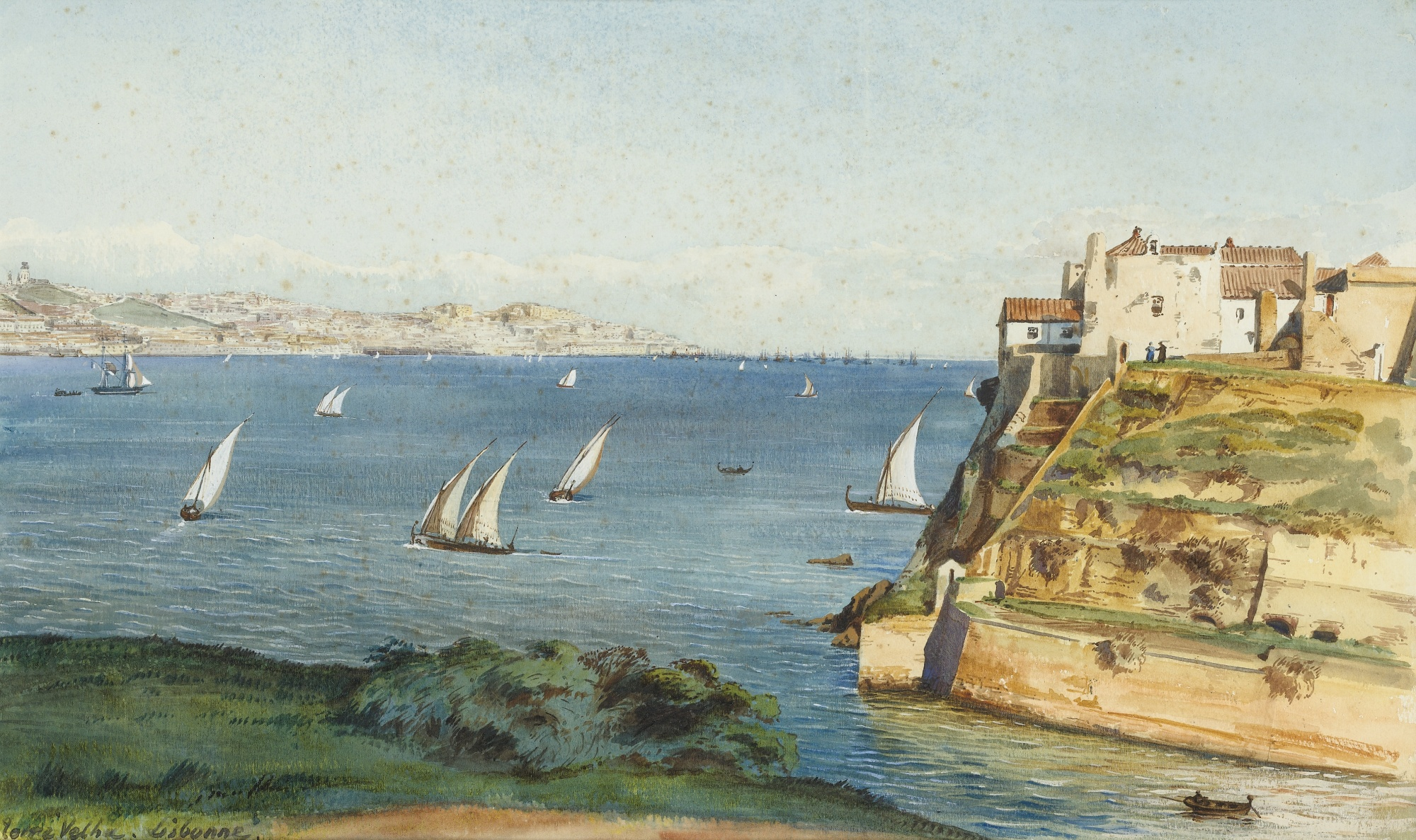
Watercolor by François d'Orléans, Torre Velha with Lisbon in the background

With the overthrow of the Second Empire in 1870, François returned to France, only to be promptly expelled by the Government of National Defense. Returning incognito, he joined the army of general Louis d'Aurelle de Paladines, under the assumed name of "Colonel Lutherod", fought bravely in Orléans, and afterwards, making public his identity, formally sought permission to serve the French army. Gambetta, however, arrested him and sent him back to England.

In the elections of 1871 to the National Assembly, the prince was elected to sit for the Haute-Marne, the department of his former principality. By an arrangement with Adolphe Thiers, however, the prince did not take his seat until the latter had been chosen president of the provisional republic.

== Deafness ==
Starting at a young age, François became increasingly deaf, and surgery to cure his hearing loss was totally unsuccessful. His friend Victor Hugo wrote in his memoirs, "The Prince de Joinville's deafness increases. Sometimes it saddens him, sometimes he makes light of it. One day he said to me: 'Speak louder, I am as deaf as a post'".

His increasing deafness prevented him from making many contributions to the National Assembly, and he resigned his parliamentary seat in 1876.

== Later life and death ==
In 1886, a new law against pretenders to the throne being part of the French armed forces deprived François of his rank as admiral.

François and Francisca lived their last decades of life together in Paris, at their home in avenue d'Antin. Francisca died in 1898, aged 73, and François outlived her by two years, dying at home on 16 June 1900, at the age of 81.

== Works ==
The Prince de Joinville was the author of several essays and pamphlets on naval affairs and other matters of public interest, which were originally published for the most part either unsigned or pseudonymously, and subsequently republished under his own name after the fall of the Empire. They include Essais sur la marine française (1853); Études sur la marine (1859 and 1870); Guerre d'Amérique, campagne du Potomac (1862 and 1872); Encore un mot sur Sadowa (Brussels, 1868); and Vieux souvenirs (1894).

François de Joinville was also a painter. He was present at the Revolution of 1830 when Charles X was replaced as king by François' father, the Orleanist Louis Philippe. Before and after that, in a number of portraits of French national life he depicted several great events in the life of the French monarchy. As Charles X's troops marshalled at the Place de la Concorde he depicted them firing on the crowd. He painted Charles X as the mob invaded the Palais-Royal, with François' father, future King Louis-Philippe, standing behind him.

In a famous scene (depicted on right), François drew a woman atop some men handing her the Tricolor as they marched on 31 July 1830. François' royal motifs contrasted heavily with Eugène Delacroix's famous depiction of the same event.

François also painted his own delivery of Napoleon's body on returning from St Helena.

In total, François painted 35 watercolours.

== Honours ==
- Kingdom of France: Grand Cross of the Legion of Honour
- Empire of Brazil: Grand Cross of the Southern Cross
- Spain: Knight of the Golden Fleece, 29 October 1846
- (Saxe-Coburg and Gotha) (Duchy of Saxe-Altenburg) (Saxe-Meiningen) Ernestine duchies: Grand Cross of the Saxe-Ernestine House Order, 1864
- Beylik of Tunis: Husainid Family Order
- Two Sicilies: Grand Cross of St. Ferdinand and Merit
- Kingdom of Portugal: Grand Cross of the Tower and Sword
- Belgium: Grand Cordon of the Order of Leopold, 22 March 1842

== Ancestry ==
Ancestors of François d'Orléans, Prince of Joinville

16. Louis, Duke of Orléans
8. Louis Philippe I, Duke of Orléans
17. Auguste of Baden-Baden
4. Louis Philippe II, Duke of Orléans
18. Louis Armand II, Prince of Conti
9. Louise Henriette de Bourbon
19. Louise Élisabeth de Bourbon
2. Louis Philippe I of France
20. Louis Alexandre, Count of Toulouse
10. Louis Jean Marie, Duke of Penthièvre
21. Marie Victoire de Noailles
5. Louise Marie Adélaïde de Bourbon
22. Francesco III d'Este, Duke of Modena
11. Maria Teresa Felicitas d'Este
23. Charlotte Aglaé of Orléans
1. François, Prince of Joinville
24. Philip V of Spain
12. Charles III of Spain
25. Elisabeth Farnese
6. Ferdinand I of the Two Sicilies
26. Augustus III of Poland
13. Maria Amalia of Saxony
27. Maria Josepha of Austria
3. Maria Amalia of Naples and Sicily
28. Leopold, Duke of Lorraine
14. Francis I, Holy Roman Emperor
29. Élisabeth Charlotte of Orléans
7. Maria Carolina of Austria
30. Charles VI, Holy Roman Emperor
15. Maria Theresa of Austria
31. Elisabeth Christine of Brunswick

== Children ==
François and Francisca's daughter, Françoise, was the mother of Prince Jean, pretender to the French throne. His own son and his grandson have been considered the legitimate claimants to the throne of France, and his great-grandson, Jean, Count of Paris, is the current claimant to the French crown.

François and Francisca's son, Pierre, entered the United States Naval Academy on 15 October 1861. He received an honorary appointment as an ensign in the United States Navy on 28 May 1863 and served on the frigate USS John Adams. He was granted a leave of absence from the Navy as of 1 January 1864 and resigned from the Navy on 30 May 1864. He returned to France in June of that year.
