= Pérez (disambiguation) =

Pérez is a surname of Spanish origin.

Pérez or Perez may also refer to:

- Perez (given name) (including a list of persons with the name)

== Places ==
- Pérez, Santa Fe, Argentina, a city
- Perez, Quezon, a municipality in the Philippines
- Pérez Pérez, a Cuban village of Camagüey Province
- Cape Perez, Graham Land, Antarctica
- Perez Peak, Graham Land, Antarctica
- Mount Perez, Oates Land, Antarctica
- Perez Glacier, Ross Dependency, Antarctica

== Other ==
- Perez., 2014 Italian film

== See also ==
- Pérès, French surname (including a list of persons with the name)
- Peres, a surname (including a list of persons with the name)
- Peretz, a surname (including a list of persons with the name)
- Pirez (disambiguation)
- Píriz, a surname
- Pires
