= Pedro =

Spanish and Portuguese male given name

- Pronunciation: Spanish: [ˈpeðɾo] Portuguese: [ˈpeðɾu]
- Gender: Male
- Language: Spanish; Portuguese

Origin
- Origin: Petra
- Meaning: Rock
- Region of origin: Spain; Latin America; Portugal; Philippines

Other names
- Alternative spelling: Petros Pero
- Related names: Peter; Pierre; Pietro; Boutros

Pedro is a masculine given name. Pedro is the Spanish, Portuguese, and Galician name for Peter. Its French equivalent is Pierre while its English and Germanic form is Peter.

The counterpart patronymic surname of the name Pedro, meaning "son of Peter" (compared with the English surname Peterson) is Pérez in Spanish, Peres in Galician and Portuguese, Pires also in Portuguese, and Peiris in coastal area of Sri Lanka (where it originated from the Portuguese version), with all ultimately meaning "son of Pero".

The name Pedro is derived via the Latin word "petra", from the Greek word "η πέτρα" meaning "stone, rock".

The name Peter itself is a translation of the Aramaic Kephas or Cephas meaning "stone".

Alternative variants are Petros and Pero.

Notable people with the name Pedro include:

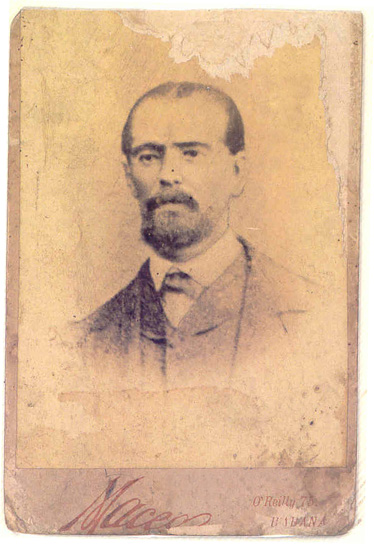
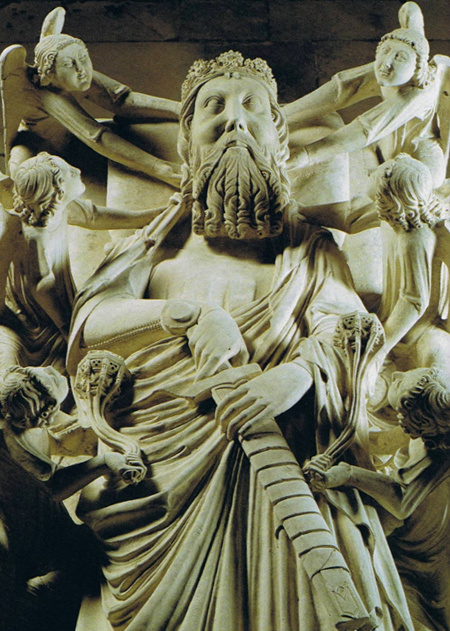
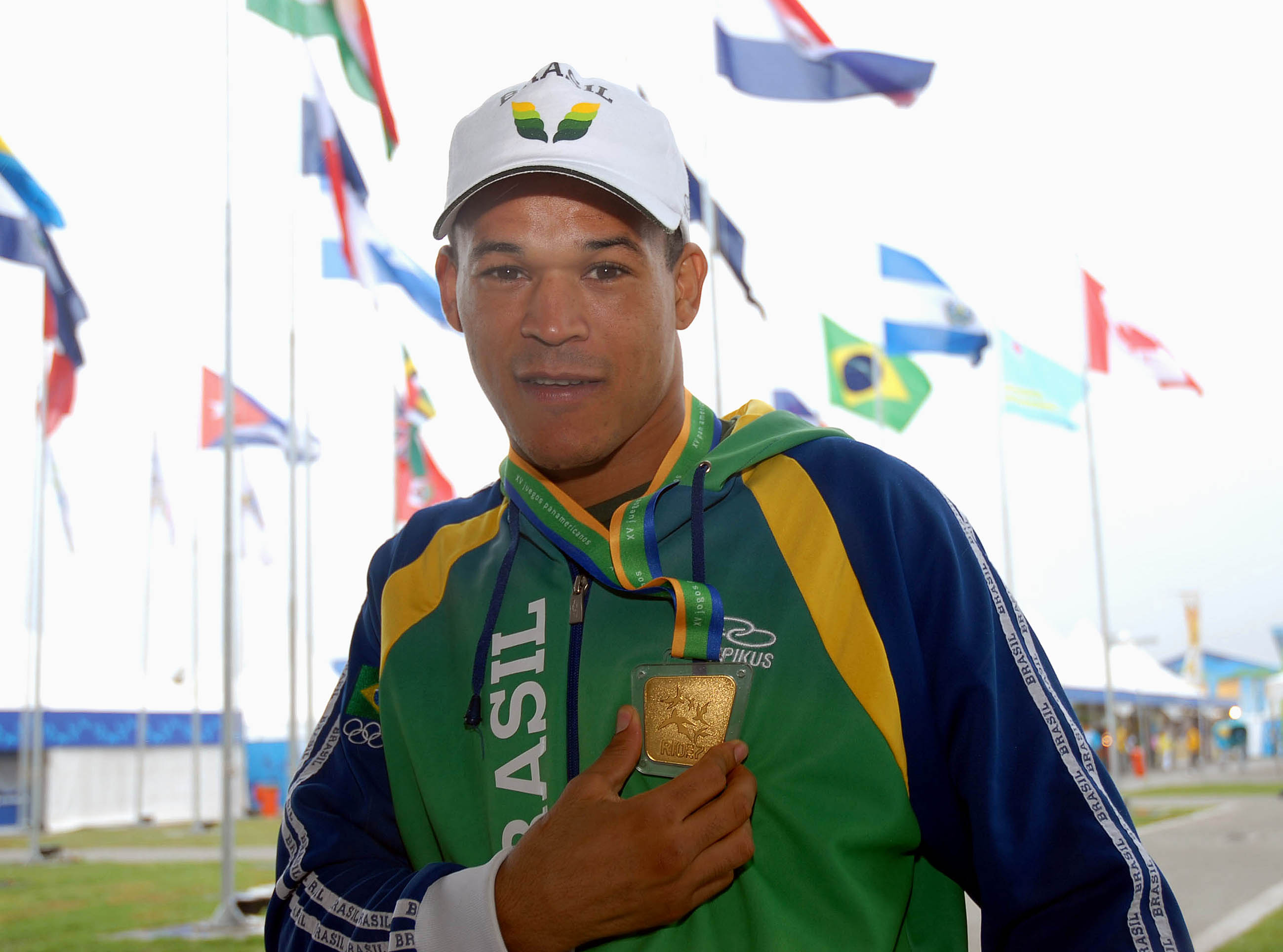
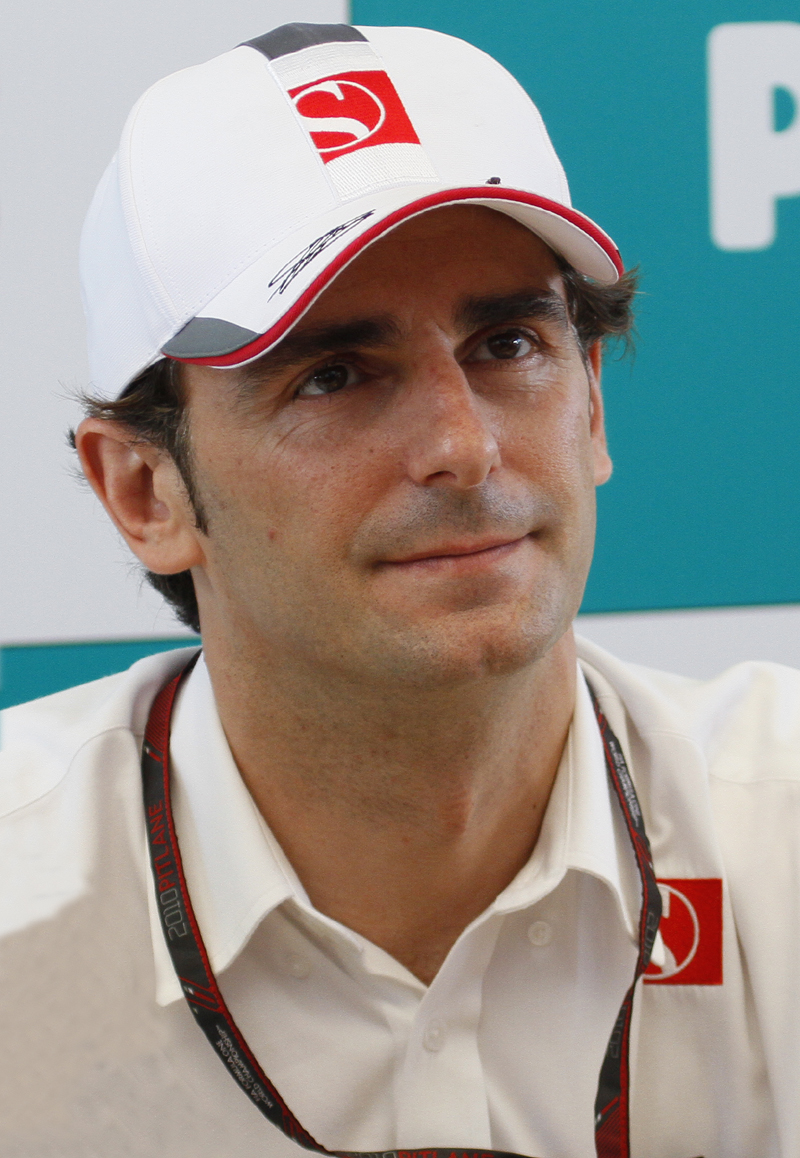

== Monarchs ==
- Pedro I of Portugal
- Pedro II of Portugal
- Pedro III of Portugal
- Pedro IV of Portugal, also Pedro I of Brazil
- Pedro V of Portugal
- Pedro II of Brazil
- Pedro of Castile
- Peter I of Aragon and Navarre, also known as Pedro I
- Peter II of Aragon
- Peter III of Aragon
- Peter IV of Aragon
- Peter V of Aragon, also Pedro IV of Barcelona

== Sport ==
=== Footballer mononyms ===
- Pedró, José Pedro Azevedo Ferreira (born 1987), Portuguese footballer
- Pedro (footballer, born 1978), Pedro Hernández Martínez, Spanish football right-back
- Pedro (footballer, born 1984), Pedro Santa Cecilia García, Spanish football midfielder
- Pedro (footballer, born 1986), Pedro Antonio Sánchez Moñino, Spanish football forward
- Pedro (footballer, born 1987), Pedro Eliezer Rodríguez Ledesma, Spanish football forward/winger
- Pedro (footballer, born 1997), Pedro Guilherme Abreu dos Santos, Brazilian football forward
- Pedro (footballer, born 1999), Pedro Augusto Cabral Carvalho, Brazilian football forward
- Pedro (footballer, born 2006), Pedro Henrique Silva dos Santos, Brazilian football forward

=== Others in sport ===
- Pedro Acosta (born 2004), Spanish motorcycle racer, 2021 Moto3 world champion
- Pedro Acosta (footballer) (born 1959), Venezuelan football manager and former player
- Pedro César Acosta (1936–2009), Mexican politician
- Pedro Aroche, Mexican race walker
- Pedro Botelho (footballer, born 1989), Brazilian footballer
- Pedro Casado (1937–2021), Spanish footballer
- Pedro Casinha (born 2003), Portuguese canoeist
- Pedro Chirivella, Spanish football player
- Pedro Collins, West Indian cricketer
- Pedro de la Rosa, Spanish racing driver
- Pedro Diniz, Brazilian racing driver
- Pedro Feliciano (1976–2021), Puerto Rican baseball player
- Pedro Gil, Spanish roller hockey player
- Pedro González López, aka Pedri, Spanish footballer
- Pedro Gusmão, Brazilian football player
- Pedro Iznaga, Cuban volleyball player
- Pedro Jirón, Nicaraguan footballer
- Pedro Lamy, Portuguese Grand Prix driver
- Pedro Lima (swimmer) (born 1971), former Olympic swimmer from Angola
- Pedro Lima (boxer) (born 1983), Brazilian boxer
- Pedro Martínez, Dominican baseball player
- Pedro Morales, Puerto Rican professional wrestler
- Pedro Neto (born 2000), Portuguese footballer
- Pedro Pérez, Cuban triple jumper
- Pedro Pineda (born 1971), Mexican former footballer
- Pedro Porro (born 1999), Spanish footballer
- Pedro Miguel Carreiro Resendes (born 1973), aka Pauletta, Portuguese former footballer
- Pedro Rivas (basketball) (1945–2007), Panamanian basketball player
- Pedro Rodríguez (disambiguation)
- Pedro Senatore Ramos, Ecuadorian football referee
- Pedro da Silva (decathlete), Brazilian decathlete
- Pedro Zabála, Bolivian footballer

== Politicians and leaders ==
- Pedro, Marshal of Navarre (c. 1471-1522), 15th- and 16th-century nobleman
- Pedro Aguirre Cerda (1879–1941), Chilean political figure
- Pedro Atacho (born 1960), Curaçaoan politician
- Pedro Eugenio Aramburu (1903-1970), President of Argentina from 1955 to 1958
- Pedro Espada Jr. (born 1953), American politician
- Pedro Pablo Kuczynski (born 1938), President of Peru from 2016 to 2018
- José Pedro Pérez-Llorca (1940–2019), Spanish politician
- Pedro Lascuráin (1856–1952), President of Mexico
- Pedro Luiz (born 1996), Brazilian politician
- Pedro Pablo Ramírez (1884-1962), President of Argentina from 1943 to 1944
- Pedro Rosselló (born 1944), Governor of Puerto Rico from 1993 to 2001
- Pedro Rousseff (born 1999), Brazilian politician
- Pedro I. "Pete" Saenz (born 1951), American politician
- Pedro Sánchez (born 1972), Prime Minister of Spain since 2018
- Pedro Agulto Tenorio (born 1941), Northern Marianan politician
- Pedro Pangelinan Tenorio (1934–2018), Northern Mariana Islander politician
- Pedro Nel Ospina Vázquez (1858–1927), Colombian general and political figure

== Explorers ==
- Pedro Álvares Cabral, Portuguese navigator and explorer
- Pedro Escobar, Portuguese explorer who discovered São Tomé and Príncipe
- Pedro Teixeira, Portuguese explorer

== Criminals ==
- Pedro Castillo, one of two murderers of a four year-old girl
- Pedro Costa de Oliveira, Brazilian serial killer
- Pedro Padilla Flores, Mexican serial killer
- Pedro Hernandez, convicted in the Disappearance of Etan Patz
- Pedro López (serial killer), Colombian serial killer
- Pedro Medina, Cuban murderer
- Pedro Pablo Nakada Ludeña, Peruvian serial killer
- Pedro Rodrigues Filho, Brazilian serial killer
- Pedro Rosa da Conceição, Brazilian mass murderer

== Other people ==
- Pedro Acerden, Filipino playwright
- Pedro Almodóvar, Spanish filmmaker
- Pedro de Ayala, Spanish diplomat
- Pedro Calungsod, Filipino saint
- Pedro Bismarck Chau, Catholic archbishop
- Pedro de San José de Betancur, Spanish saint and missionary in Guatemala
- Pedro Alcantara de Souza (died 2010), Brazilian land reform activist
- Pedro Dimas, Mexican musician
- Pedro Duro, Spanish businessman
- Perucho Figueredo, Cuban poet
- Pedro Friedeberg, Italian-born Mexican artist and designer
- Pedro Gomez (journalist), American television reporter
- Pedro Ignacio Calderón, Argentine conductor
- Pedro Luis Díaz Lanz, Cuban soldier and defector
- Pedro X. Molina (born 1976), Nicaraguan caricaturist
- Pedro Nunes, Portuguese mathematician
- Pedro Páez, Spanish Jesuit missionary in Ethiopia
- Pedro Pascal, Chilean-American actor
- Pedro Reyes (comedian), Spanish comedian
- Pedro Rodriguez (scientist), Puerto Rican scientist and inventor
- Pedro Rodríguez (soldier), Puerto Rican Korean War hero
- Pedro Sousa, Portuguese tennis player
- Pedro Trebbau, German-born, Venezuelan zoologist
- Pedro Vieira, portuguese scientist
- Pedro Wonaeamirri (born 1974), Aboriginal Australian artist
- Pedro Yap, former Philippine Chief Justice
- Pedro Zamora, cast member on The Real World
- Pedro Zarraluki, Spanish writer
- Pero Vaz de Caminha, Portuguese knight

== Fictional characters ==
- Pedro Penduko, a Filipino comic book character

== See also ==
- Pedro (disambiguation)
- Pérez
