= Press (surname) =

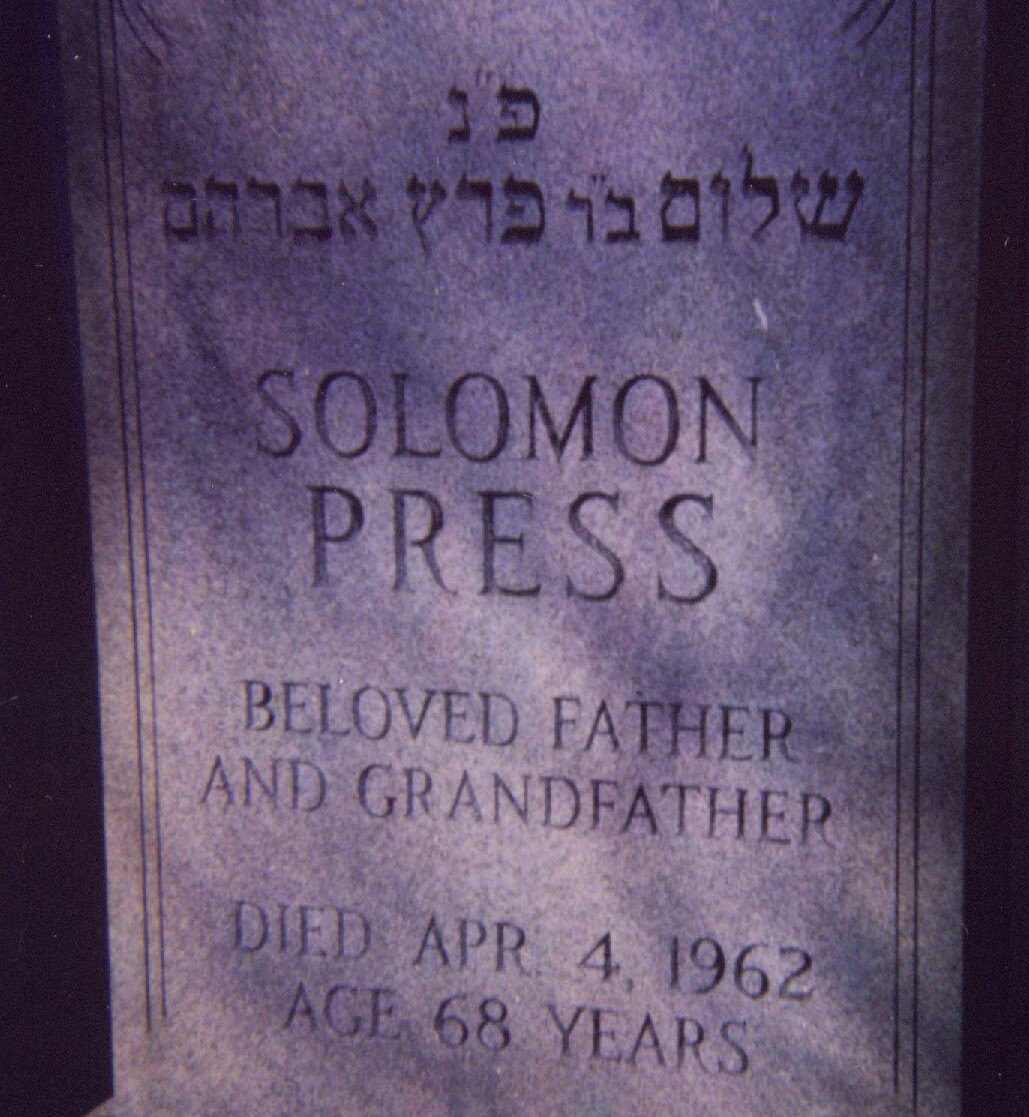
Gravestone of Solomon Press showing Hebrew name Peretz (פרץ)

Press is a surname with two unrelated origins. In England and Wales, it derives from Priest or Price. In Eastern Europe (especially centered around Minsk), it is a Jewish name, likely derived from the name Peretz. It also is a metonymic occupational surname that refers to the occupation of someone who ironed clothes, derived from the Yiddish "pres" or flat iron.

People with the surname include:

- Andrea L. Press (born 1955), American sociologist
- Ben Press (1924–2016), American tennis player, coach and writer
- Bill Press (born 1940), American talk radio host
- Christen Press (born 1988), American soccer player
- Evan Press (born 2000), Welsh footballer
- Fiona Press, Australian actress
- Frank Press (1924–2020), American geophysicist
- Irina Press (1939–2004), Soviet multi-sport track and field athlete
- J. Press (fl. 1910), American clothier founder
- Jim Press (born 1947), American automobile executive
- Jürgen Press (born 1965), German football manager
- Karen Press (born 1956), South African poet
- Malcolm Press (born 1958), British ecologist and professor
- Margaret Press (born 1947), American investigative genetic genealogist
- Mikhail Press (1871–1938), Russian-American violinist and conductor
- Moses Alexandrovich Press (1861–1901), Russian engineer
- Natalie Press (born 1980), English actress
- Nigel Press (born 1949), British geologist who pioneered the development of commercial applications of satellite earth observation technology
- Robin Press (born 1994), Swedish ice hockey player
- Sara L. Press (born 1974), American book artist
- Steve Press (born 1946), American politician
- Tamara Press (1937–2021), Soviet shot putter and discus thrower, sister of Irina Press
- Toby Orenstein née Press (born 1937), American theatrical director, producer, and educator
- William J. Press (fl. 1908), British wrestler
- William H. Press (born 1948), American astrophysicist
- Yeshayahu Press (1874–1955), researcher of the land of Israel

== See also ==
- Peretz
- Perutz
- Perez
- Peres
- Price
