= Peiris =

- Pronunciation: පීරිස්
- Language: Sinhalese

Origin
- Language: Portuguese
- Origin: Son of Peter

Other names
- Variant forms: Peries; Pieris

Peiris, Peries or Pieris (Sinhalese: පීරිස්) is a surname attributed to the Sinhalese people of Sri Lanka. It is a common surname in the coastal regions of the island nation.

The name originated from the Portuguese surname Peres, and was spread across Sri Lanka during Portugal's colonization of the country. It is related to the Spanish variant Pérez, and Jewish variant Peretz. The name has been adapted into the Sinhalese language over time, hence the variation in its spelling.

Notable people with the surname include:

- Albert Peries (1905–1967), Ceylonese politician
- Ivan Peries (1921–1988), Sri Lankan painter
- Lester James Peries (1919–2018), Sri Lankan film director
- Sumitra Peries (1935–2023), Sri Lankan film director
- Amal Peiris (born 1985), Sri Lankan cricketer
- Bernard Peiris (1908–1977), Ceylonese lawyer
- Chathurika Peiris (born 1981), Sri Lankan actress
- Eardley Peiris, Ceylonese broadcaster
- Edmund Peiris, Ceylonese headman
- Edmund Peiris, Sri Lankan clergyman, 2nd Bishop of Halawata
- G. L. Peiris (born 1946), Sri Lankan academic and politician
- Harold Peiris (1905–1981), Ceylonese lawyer
- Hiranya Peiris (born 1974), British astrophysicist
- J. B. Peiris, Sri Lankan physician
- James Peiris (1856–1930), Ceylonese politician
- M. V. P. Peiris (1898–1988), Ceylonese surgeon and politician
- Malik Peiris (born 1949), Hong Kong physician and academic
- Milinda Peiris, Sri Lankan army officer
- Mohan Peiris, Sri Lankan lawyer and judge
- Ruwin Peiris (born 1970), Sri Lankan cricketer
- Sachintha Peiris (born 1995), Sri Lankan cricketer
- Stanley Peiris (1941–2002), Sri Lankan musician
- Walikalage Sarath Peiris Jayawardene (born 1969), Sri Lankan Sinhala cricketer
- Ernest Victor Pieris (1926–1991), Sri Lankan physician, medical educator, cricketer and rugby player
- Mevan Pieris (born 1946), Sri Lankan cricketer
- Nehara Pieris, Sri Lankan actress
- Justin Pieris Deraniyagala (1903–1967), Sri Lankan Sinhala painter

== See also ==
- Pieris (disambiguation)
- Peres
- Pires
