= Perets (disambiguation) =

Perets may refer to:

- Perez (son of Judah), a Biblical caharacter
- Perets (surname)
- Spelling variant of the name Peretz
- Perets', Ukrainian satirical illustrated magazine
