= Ruvin =

Ruvin or Ruwin is a masculine given name. Notable people with the name include:

- Ruvin Peiris (born 2000), Sri Lankan cricketer
- Ruwin Peiris (born 1970), Sri Lankan first-class cricketer

== See also ==
- Rubin
- Ruvim
