= Press =

Press may refer to:

== Media ==
- Publisher
- News media
- Printing press, commonly called "the press"
- Press TV, an Iranian television network

=== Newspapers ===
==== United States ====
- The Press, a former name of The Press-Enterprise, Riverside, California
- The Ridgefield Press, Ridgefield, Connecticut, published weekly
- The Grand Rapids Press, Grand Rapids, Michigan
- The Oakland Press, Oakland County, Michigan
- The Press of Atlantic City, Atlantic City, New Jersey
- Riverdale Press, Bronx, New York City, New York, a weekly publication
- The Dickinson Press, Dickinson, North Dakota
- Cleveland Press, Cleveland, Ohio, published from 1876 to 1982
- The Philadelphia Press, Philadelphia, Pennsylvania, published from 1857 to 1920
- The Pittsburgh Press, a historic newspaper in Pittsburgh, Pennsylvania, that ceased publication in 1991
- The Sheboygan Press, Sheboygan, Wisconsin

==== Elsewhere ====
- The Press, online student newspaper produced by SAIT Polytechnic, Calgary, Alberta, Canada
- The Press (York), an English regional newspaper
- Guernsey Press, the only daily newspaper in Guernsey
- The Irish Press, an Irish national newspaper from 1931 to 1995
- The Press, published in Christchurch, New Zealand
- Press (Belgrade newspaper), published in Serbia between 2005 and 2012

== People ==
- Press (surname), a family name of English origin
- Press Cruthers (1890–1976), American Major League Baseball player
- Press Maravich (1915–1987), American basketball player and coach
- Press Taylor (born 1988), American football coach

== Music ==
- The Press (band), a New York City Oi! band
- Press (album), by MU330
- "Press" (Paul McCartney song)
- "Press" (Cardi B song)

== Sports and fitness ==
- Bench press
- Overhead press, the act of lifting a weight above the head
- Full-court press, a tactic in basketball

== Other uses ==
- A "press" in Henry Murray's system of needs
- Machine press, a machine tool that changes the shape of a work-piece by the application of pressure
- "the Press", colloquial name for pressganging, a 17th- to 19th-century Royal Navy method of forced conscription
- Press (restaurant), a Michelin-starred restaurant in St. Helena, California
- Press (TV series), a 2018 BBC One/PBS TV series
- Press (film), a Turkish film
- Press Holdings, a UK holding company
- PRESS statistic, a statistic in regression analysis
- Linen-press, a cupboard or cabinet for storing clothes or linen

== See also ==
- Daily Press (disambiguation)
- Pressing (disambiguation)
