= Pieris =

Pieris may refer to:

== Organisms ==
- Pieris (plant), the andromeda or fetterbush, a plant genus in the family Ericaceae
- Pieris (butterfly), the garden whites, a butterfly genus in the family Pieridae
- Pieris, a synonym of the genus Pierella in the butterfly family Nymphalidae

== Places ==
- Pieris, Italy, a hamlet of San Canzian d'Isonzo in Italy
- Pieris, a municipal unit and a historic region in Greece
- Pieris, an ancient name of the Greek settlement Kondariotissa
- Pieres, an ancient Thracian tribe living in the Pieria region
- Piereis, a municipal unit in Kavala regional unit, Greece

== People ==
- Marie Pieris, Lady Seton, French-born Scottish courtier
- Mevan Pieris (born 1946), Sri Lankan former cricket player
- Paules Edward Pieris Deraniyagala (1900–1976), a Sri Lankan paleontologist, zoologist and artist
- Aloysius Pieris (1934–2026), Jesuit Priest and director of the Tulana Center in Sri Lanka

== Other uses ==
- Pieris (mythology), a figure in Greek mythology

== See also ==
- Pieris Kurundu, a type 7 cinnamon of the Cinnamomum verum variety
- Peiris, a surname
- Pierian Spring, the metaphorical source of knowledge about art and science
