= Perets (surname) =

Perets is a surname, a spelling variant of Peretz. Notable people with the surname include:

- Amir Perets (born 1974), Israeli-born American mixed martial artist, entrepreneur
- Sergey Perets (1969–2002), Russian police officer
- Yaniv Perets (born 2000), Canadian college ice hockey goaltender

== See also ==
- Perez
