= Pires =

Pires is a common surname in the Portuguese language, namely in Portugal and Brazil. It was originally a patronymic, meaning Son of Pedro or Son of Pero (English: Peter). Its Spanish equivalent is Pérez. It is a variant form of Peres. It may mean different things:

== People ==
- Alda Ferreira Pires Barreto de Lara Albuquerque (1930–1962), Angolan-Portuguese writer
- Alfredo Pires (born 1964), Timor-Leste politician
- Aloísio Pires Alves (born 1963), Brazilian footballer
- Álvaro Henrique Alves Pires (born 1985), Brazilian footballer
- Anabela Braz Pires (born 1976), Portuguese singer and actress
- Arlindo do Carmo Pires Barbeitos (1940–2021), Angolan poet
- Cléo Pires (born 1982), Brazilian actress
- Cornélio Pires (1884–1958), Brazilian journalist, writer and folklorist
- Diogo Pires (1500–1532), known as Solomon Molcho, a self-proclaimed Jewish Messiah
- Emília Pires, Timor-Leste Minister of Finance
- Felipe Pires (born 1995), Brazilian footballer
- Fernão Pires de Andrade (died 1523), Portuguese merchant and official
- Francisco Fortunato Pires (born 1948), São Toméan politician
- Gérard Pirès (born 1942), French film director and writer
- Glória Pires (born 1963), Brazilian actress
- Hilda Pires dos Reis (1919-2001), Brazilian composer
- Isabel Cristina Torreão Pires (born 1961), Brazilian serial killer and cannibal
- Isabel Pires (born 1990), Portuguese politician
- João Murça Pires (1917–1994), Brazilian botanist
- Jorge Costa Pires (born 1981), Portuguese footballer
- José Cardoso Pires (1925–1998), Portuguese writer
- José Mariano Rebelo Pires Gago, Portuguese high-energy physicist and Minister for Science
- Loick Pires (born 1989), English footballer
- Maria do Carmo Trovoada Pires de Carvalho Silveira (born 1960), São Toméan politician
- Maria João Pires (born 1944), Portuguese pianist
- Mário Lemos Pires (1930–2009), last governor of Portuguese Timor
- Mário Pires (born 1949), Guinea-Bissau politician and former Prime Minister
- Nuno Pires, South African bioinformatician
- Paulo Pires (born 1967), Portuguese model and actor
- Pedro Pires (born 1934), President of Cape Verde
- Robert Pires (born 1973), French footballer
- Rosemir Pires (born 1978), Brazilian footballer
- Tomé Pires (1465–1540), first Portuguese envoy to China

== See also ==
- Peiris, Sinhala surname of Português origin
- Pirez (disambiguation)
- Píriz, a surname
- Pires Ferreira family, an influential family from Brazil
