= Florida Municipal Museum =

Museum in Florida, Cuba

- Museo Municipal de Florida
- Location of museum in Florida
- Established: 12 December 1981
- Location: Carretera Central No. 501 e/ República y Libertad, Florida, Camagüey, Cuba
- Coordinates: 21.525645°N 78.223976°W

Florida Municipal Museum is a museum located in Florida, Cuba. It was established on 12 December 1981. The museum holds collections on history, weaponry, archeology, numismatics, and natural science.

== See also ==
- List of museums in Cuba
