= Ada Zayas-Bazán =

Cuban children's author, poet and teacher

- Born: María Zayas-Bazán Hernández; 14 October 1958 (age 67) Florida, Cuba
- Occupation: Author; teacher; poet
- Language: Spanish

María Zayas-Bazán Hernández (born 14 October 1958), known as Ada Zayas-Bazán, is a children's author, poet and teacher from Cuba. She was born in the town of Florida in Camagüey Province, Cuba. She writes in the Spanish language and is known for her works Pupa, Palabras Mágicas, and Dulce Hogar.
