= Ed Bauta =

Cuban baseball player (1935–2022)

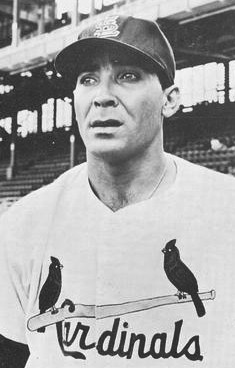
- Bauta in 1962
- Relief pitcher
- Born: January 6, 1935; Florida, Cuba
- Died: July 6, 2022 (aged 87); Little Egg Harbor, New Jersey, U.S.
- Batted: Right Threw: Right

MLB debut
- July 6, 1960, for the St. Louis Cardinals

Last MLB appearance
- May 9, 1964, for the New York Mets

MLB statistics
- Win–loss record: 6–6
- Earned run average: 4.35
- Strikeouts: 89
- Innings pitched: 149
- Saves: 11
- Stats at Baseball Reference

Teams
- St. Louis Cardinals (1960–1963); New York Mets (1963–1964)

Eduardo Bauta Galvez (January 6, 1935 – July 6, 2022) was a Cuban-born professional baseball player. A right-handed relief pitcher, he worked in 97 games in Major League Baseball as a member of the St. Louis Cardinals (1960–1963) and New York Mets (1963–1964). Bauta was born in Florida, Camagüey Province, Cuba. He was listed as 6 feet 3 inches (1.91 m) tall and 200 pounds (91 kg).

Bauta's pro career extended for 14 seasons, from 1956 to 1964, 1967 to 1969, and 1972 to 1973. Originally signed by the Pittsburgh Pirates, he was sent to the Cardinals in a May 1960 trade that had a positive impact on both teams. The Pirates received starting pitcher Vinegar Bend Mizell, who helped them win the 1960 National League pennant. Along with Bauta, the Cardinals got a minor league second baseman whose path to the majors was blocked by a future Baseball Hall of Famer, Bill Mazeroski. The young second baseman, Julián Javier, would play for the Cardinals for a dozen seasons, make two National League All-Star teams, and help St. Louis win three pennants and two World Series championships.

Bauta pitched sporadically for the 1960 Cardinals, getting into nine games and picking up his first MLB save. He began 1961 with Triple-A Portland, where in 35 games he won nine of ten decisions and compiled a stellar 1.95 earned run average. The Cardinals recalled him in July and used him in 13 games. He won two and lost none, allowed only 12 hits and three earned runs in 191/3 innings pitched (for a 1.40 ERA), and was credited with five saves. In 1962, he started strongly, with a 1.88 earned run average in 14 appearances through June 10. Then he was treated roughly in three appearances against the Pirates and Philadelphia Phillies, sending his ERA soaring to 5.01. After June 30, he was sent to Triple-A Atlanta to regain his form.

That set the stage for Bauta's only full year in the majors, 1963. Again, he was effective through mid-season; on July 1, after 28 games, he had posted a 1.70 ERA. Then, over ten July appearances, it climbed by over two full runs, to 3.98. Ron Taylor and Bobby Shantz took over as the Redbirds' main relievers. Seeking another left-hander for their bullpen, the contending Cardinals traded Bauta to the last-place Mets for Ken MacKenzie on August 5. Bauta worked in 17 games for the Mets over the 1963 and 1964 seasons, all in relief, but was ineffective: he lost his only two decisions, posted a poor 5.28 ERA, and recorded only one save. The Mets sent him to Triple-A at the May 1964 cutdown, and he never appeared again in the big leagues, although he worked in the high minors for the rest of his professional career.

In his 97 major league games, Bauta compiled a 6–6 win–loss record and 11 saves, with a 4.35 earned run average. He allowed 148 hits and 70 bases on balls in 149 innings pitched, with 89 strikeouts.
