= Perec =

Perec is a surname. Notable people with the surname include:

- Georges Perec, (1936–1982), French novelist of Polish-Jewish origin (the surname is the Polish spelling of the Biblical Hebrew name Peretz)
- Marie-José Pérec, (born 1968), French athlete
- Tanja Perec (b. 1992), Croatian sports shooter

== See also ==
- Peretz
