= Florida, Cuba =

Florida
- Municipality
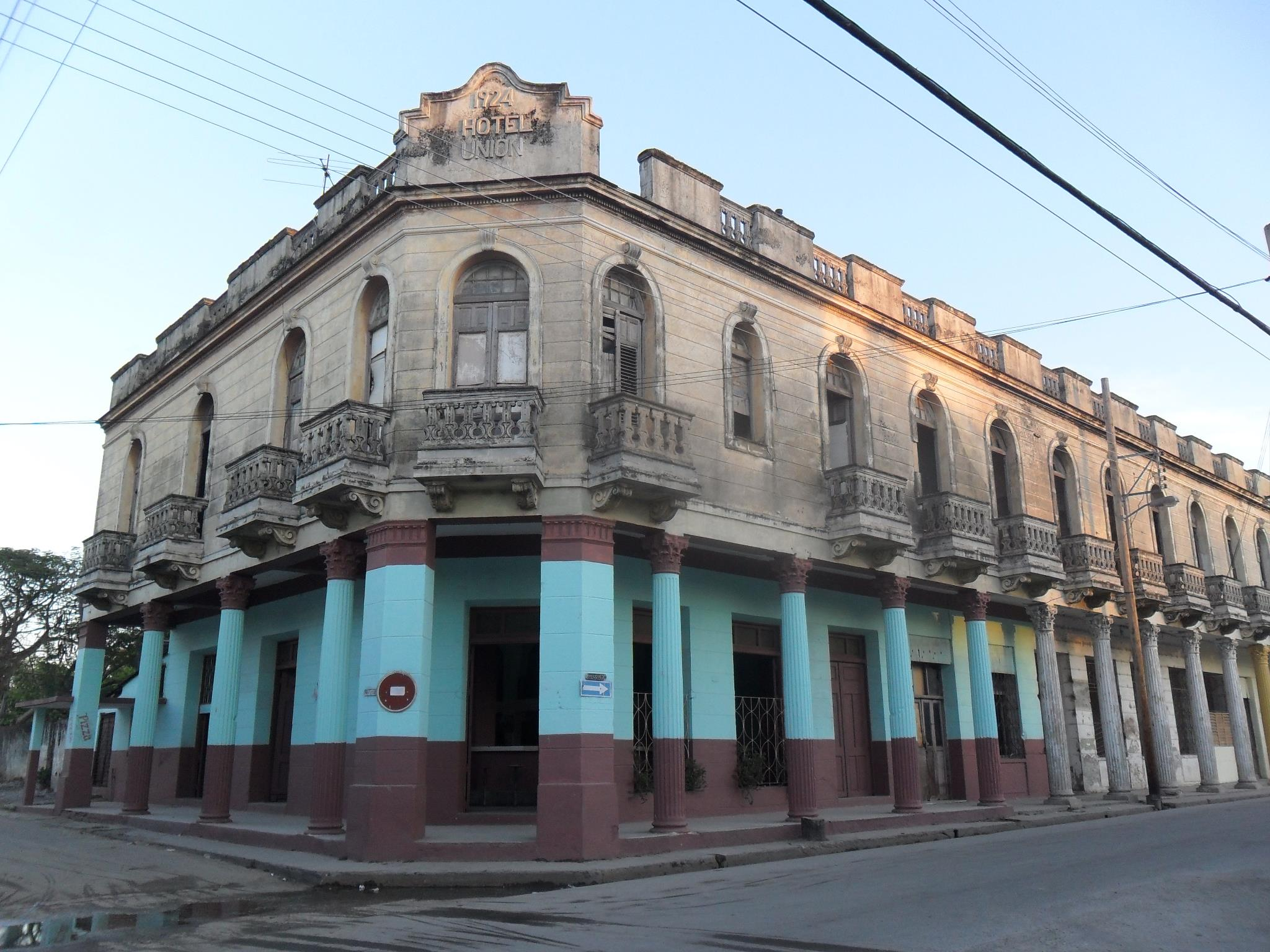
- Facade of the Hotel Unión

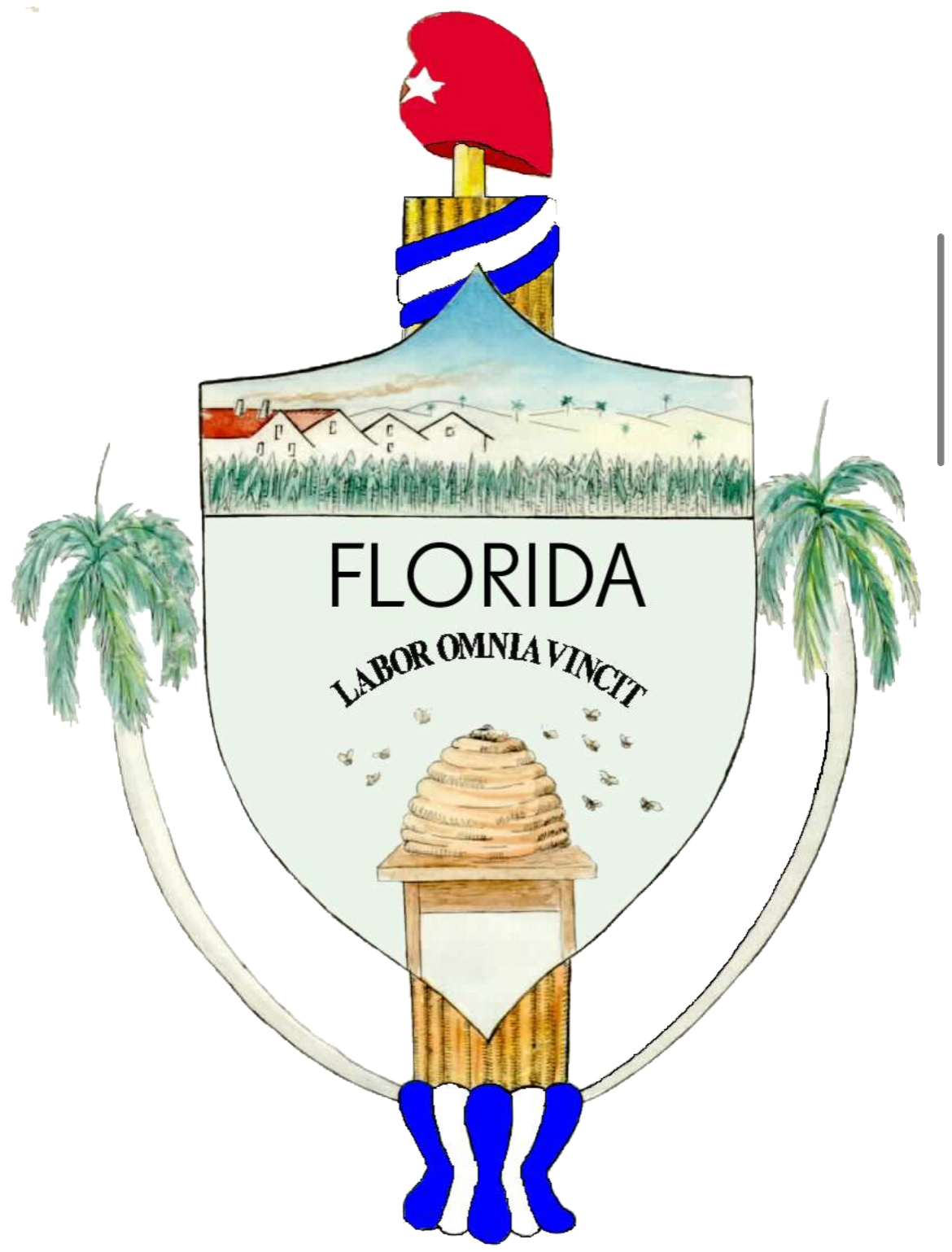
- Coat of arms

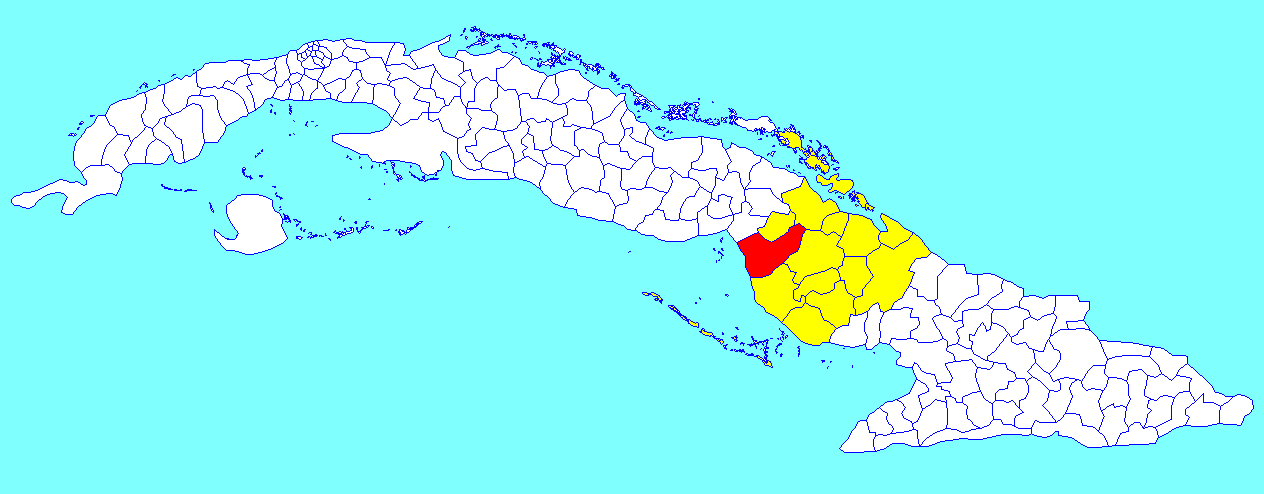
- Florida municipality (red) within Camagüey Province (yellow) and Cuba
- Coordinates: 21°31′46″N 78°13′22″W
- Country: Cuba
- Province: Camagüey
- Founded: 1907
- Established: 1924

Area
  - Total: 1,800 km^{2} (690 sq mi)
- Elevation: 65 m (213 ft)

Population (2022)
  - Total: 69,174
  - Density: 38/km^{2} (100/sq mi)
- Time zone: UTC-5 (EST)
- Area code: +53-322
- Climate: Aw

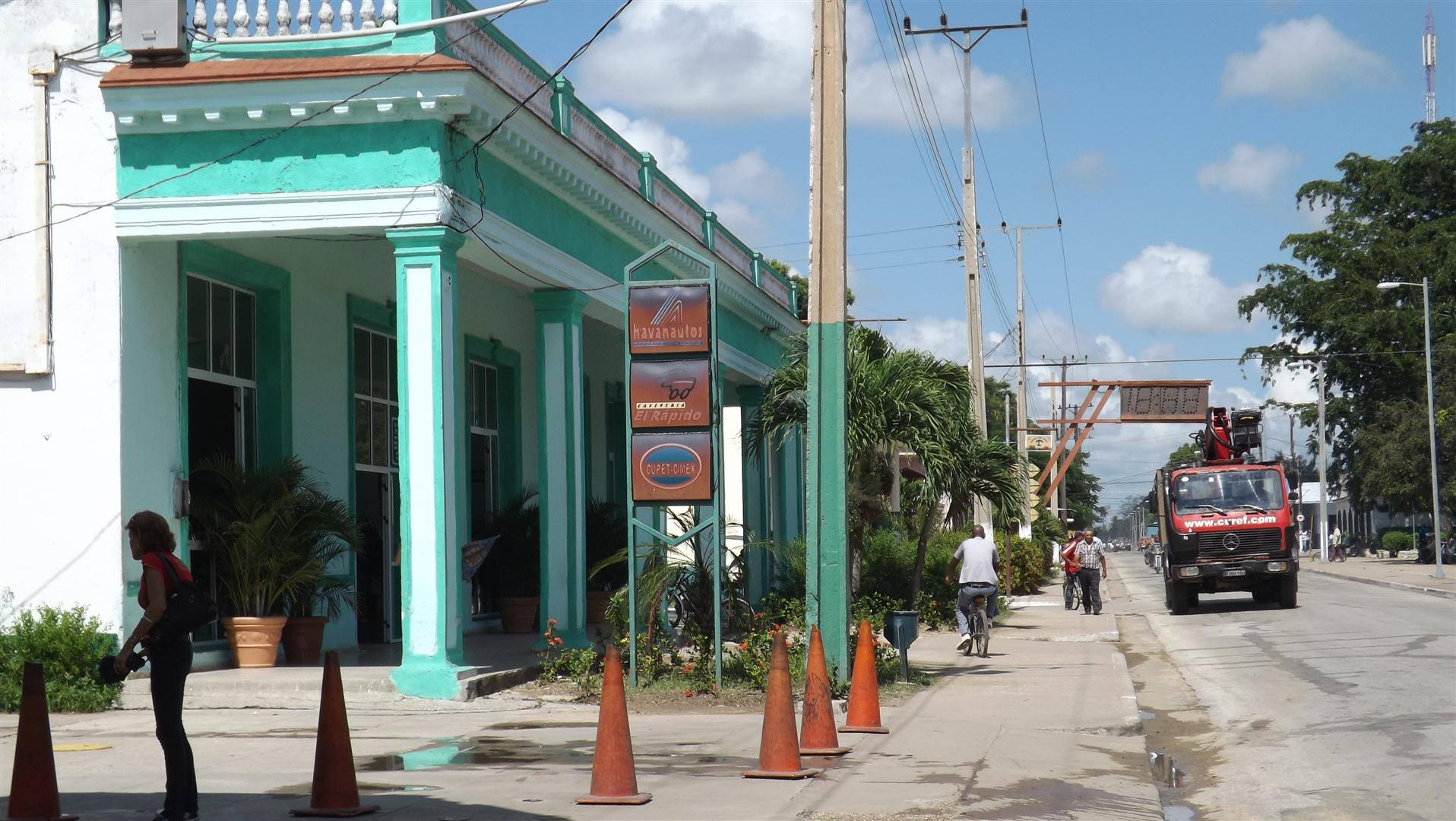
The "Carretera Central" crossing Florida's centre

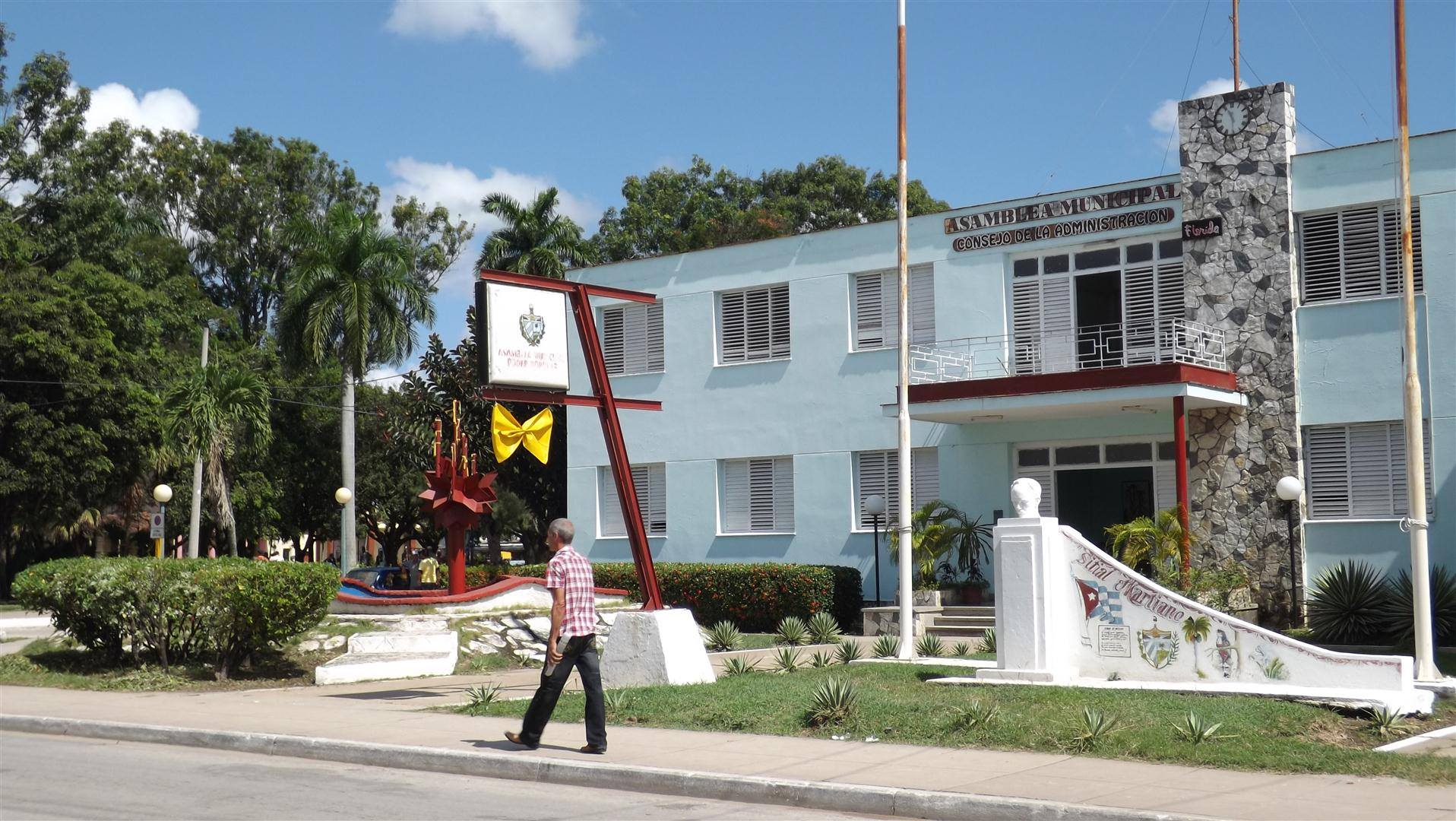
Florida city hall

Florida (Spanish pronunciation: [floˈɾiða]) is a municipality and city in the Camagüey Province of Cuba. It is located 40 km (25 mi) north-west of Camagüey, along the Carretera Central highway. The city was established in 1907, and the municipality was established in 1924. Of all the municipalities of the Cuban province of Camagüey, Florida is third in area size. The name is Spanish for Land of flowers.

== History ==
The town was founded in 1907 and, in 1949, the politician Francisco Díaz Marchand presented a project to turn it into an independent municipality. The project did not prosper, but in 1960 Manuel Frías Morales drafted a law to carry out the feasibility studies for the foundation of the municipality, but the opinion was adverse. Later, the Law #30 of June 14, 1971 created the municipality of Florida, one of the youngest of the island.

== Geography ==
The municipality is located northwest of its province, next to the borders with Ciego de Ávila Province. Its elevation is represented by the Urabo Mountain with a height of 132.5 m. The bordering municipalities are Baraguá, Céspedes, Esmeralda, Camagüey and Vertientes.

The municipal territory includes the villages and the localities of Alberto Becerra, Algarrobo, Conquista, El Angel, El Trece, La Alína, La Caridad, La Esperanza, La Jagua, La Porfuerza, La Serafina, La Tomatera, La Vallita, Las Margaritas, Las Mercedes, Las Parras, Las Tusas, Los Güines, María Dos, María Seis, Manzanillo, Ortigal, Otero, Pérez Pérez, Playa Florida, San Antonio, San Diego, San Faustino, San Jerónimo, Santa Gertrudis, Urabo and Vista Alegre. Until the 1977 municipal reform, it included the village of Magarabomba too, currently part of Céspedes.

== Demographics ==
In 2022, the municipality of Florida had a population of 69,174, 56,271 of them in the town proper. With a total area of 1,800 km^{2} (690 sq mi), it has a population density of 38/km^{2} (98/sq mi).

== Health ==
Florida has 283 doctors, 187 of them are family physicians. There are 125 health facilities, including hospitals (a general and a pediatric one), clinics, pharmacies and laboratories.

== Education ==
There are 64 educational centers with a total of 15,013 students attending primary, secondary, and pre-university. Florida also offers night schools with a range of educational careers for adults who can not attend during daylight hours.

== Culture ==
=== Cultural Institutions ===
- Casa de Cultura "Luis Casas Romero"
- Biblioteca Pública Municipal "Rubén Martínez Villena"
- Biblioteca Pública "Tamara Bunke"
- Biblioteca Pública "Ignacio Agramonte"
- Florida Municipal Museum
- Casa de la Trova "Pedro Loforte Sablón"
- Banda Municipal de Concierto
- Librería Municipal "América Latina"
- Galería de Arte
- Centro Literario Municipal
- Museo General
- Cine Aurora
- Sala de Vídeo Comunidad Algarrobo
- Sala de Vídeo Comunidad San Antonio
- Sala de Vídeo Agramonte
- Sala de Vídeo Micro Distrito
- Sala de Vídeo del Cementerio

=== Traditions ===
- Semana de la Cultura Floridana
- Carnaval Floridano

== Transport ==
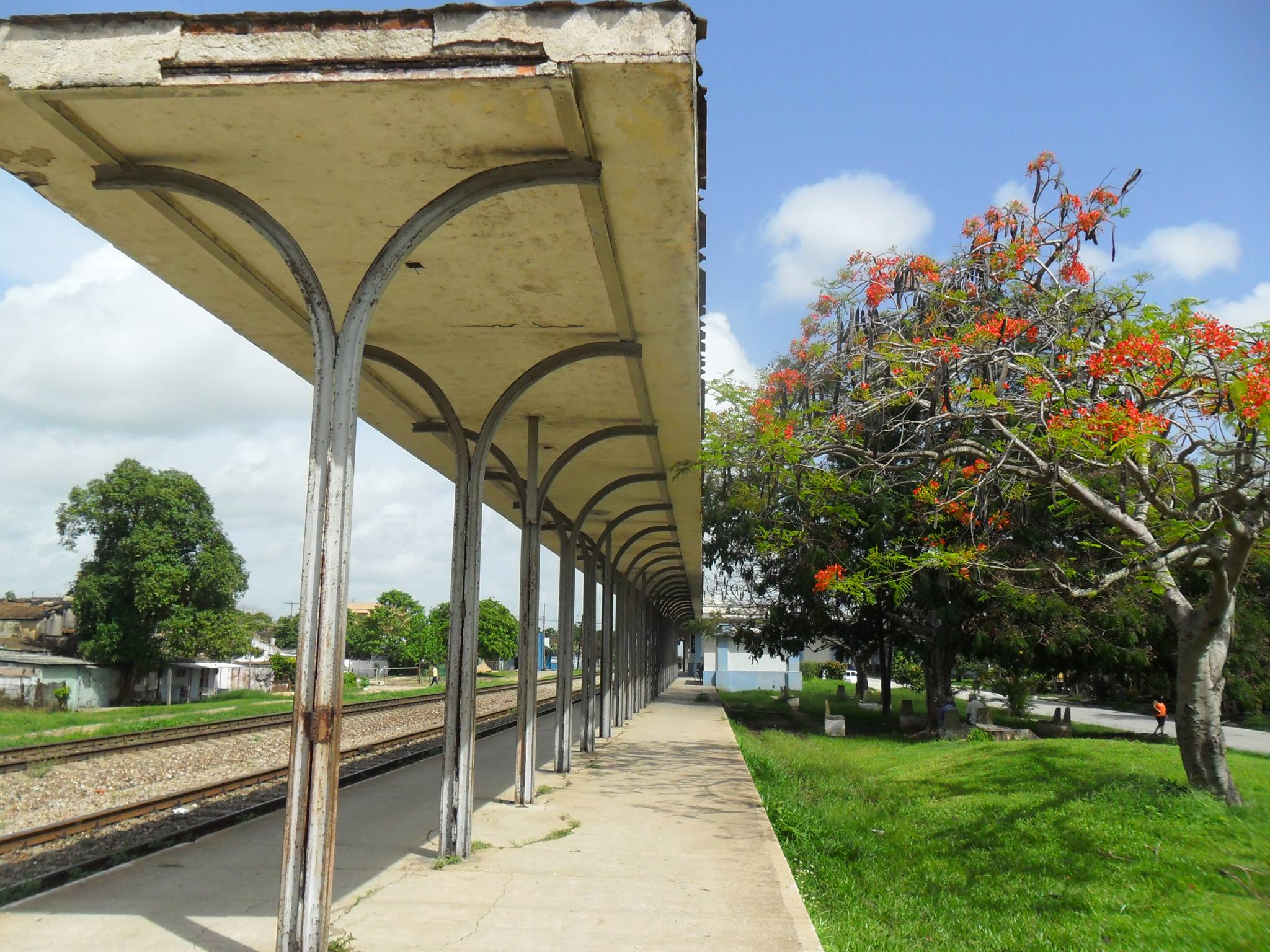
Florida railway station

Florida is served by the "Central Railway" (Ferrocarril Central) Havana-Santiago, with local and long-distance trains. It is crossed by the national highway "Carretera Central" (CC) and, the future extension of the A1 motorway, will involve the town.

== Personalities ==
- Ed Bauta (b. 1930), former baseball player
- Dairon Blanco (baseball), center fielder for the Kansas City Royals MLB team
- Calixto Morales Hernández (1940s–2013), politician and revolutionary
- Ada Zayas-Bazán (b. 1958), writer

== See also ==
- List of cities in Cuba
- Municipalities of Cuba
