= Daily Press =

There are several newspapers named the Daily Press:

== Canada ==
- Timmins Daily Press, Timmins, Ontario

== Hong Kong ==
- Daily Press (Hong Kong), a defunct English-language newspaper formerly published in Hong Kong

== United States ==
- Ashland Daily Press, a daily newspaper based in Ashland, Wisconsin
- Daily Press (California), a daily newspaper published in Victorville, California
- Daily Press (Michigan), a daily newspaper (Monday through Saturday) published in Escanaba, Michigan
- Daily Press (Virginia), a daily newspaper published in Newport News, Virginia
- Silver City Daily Press and Independent, a daily newspaper (Monday through Saturday) published in Silver City, New Mexico

== See also ==
- Press (disambiguation)
