= Stephen L. Neal =

American politician

Steve Neal
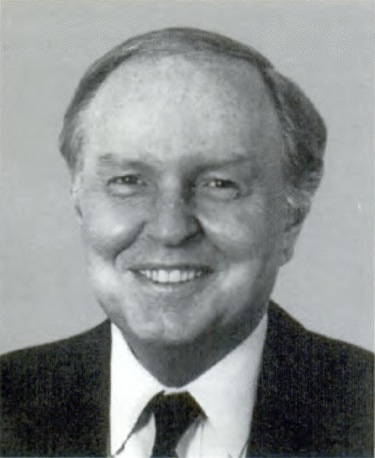

Member of the U.S. House of Representatives from North Carolina's 5th district
- In office January 3, 1975 – January 3, 1995
- Preceded by: Wilmer Mizell
- Succeeded by: Richard Burr

Personal details
- Born: Stephen Lybrook Neal; November 7, 1934 (age 91) Winston-Salem, North Carolina, U.S.
- Party: Democratic
- Education: University of California, Santa Barbara; University of Hawaiʻi, Mānoa (BA)

Stephen Lybrook Neal (born November 7, 1934) is a former North Carolina Democratic politician who served ten terms in the U.S. House of Representatives (1975–1995).

Born in Winston-Salem, North Carolina, Neal moved to California, graduated from Narbonne High School in Lomita in 1952, and eventually graduated from the University of Hawaii in 1959.

Neal ran for the Democratic Party nomination for North Carolina's 5th congressional district in the 1974 elections. He defeated Joe Felmet in the primary election, and won an upset victory over incumbent Republican Wilmer Mizell. Neal benefited from voter anger over the Watergate Scandal, which resulted in dozens of Republican incumbents being defeated. He was reelected nine more times against vigorous opposition in a district that stretched from Winston-Salem to the Blue Ridge, even as the area grew more conservative.

He chose not to seek re-election in 1994, and his seat was won that November by his 1992 opponent, future Senator Richard Burr.

U.S. House of Representatives
Preceded by Wilmer Mizell	Member of the U.S. House of Representatives from North Carolina's 5th congressional district 1975–1995	Succeeded by Richard Burr
U.S. order of precedence (ceremonial)
Preceded by Joe Crowley as Former U.S. Representative	Order of precedence of the United States as Former U.S. Representative	Succeeded by Mel Watt as Former U.S. Representative
