= Pressing =

Pressing may refer to:

- Pressing (association football), a defensive tactic
- Pressing (execution), a method of killing by crushing
- Pressing (metalworking), also known as stamping, a manufacturing process
- Pressing (wine), the extraction of juice from crushed grapes during wine making
- Expeller pressing or oil pressing, a mechanical method for extracting oil from raw materials
- Full-court press, a defensive tactic in basketball
- Hohe Pressing, a hill in the Central Eastern Alps, Austria
- Hot pressing, a powder metallurgy process
- Hot isostatic pressing, a manufacturing process
- Plant pressing, a botanical collection technique
- Pressing plant, a machine for producing vinyl sound recordings
- Presing, a Serbian band also known as Pressing

== See also ==
- Press (disambiguation)
