= Sara Pérez =

Sara Pérez may refer to:

- Sara Pérez (diver) (born 1996), diver from Colombia, competed in diving at the 2015 World Aquatics Championships – Women's 10 metre platform
- Sara Pérez Romero (1870–1952), Mexican politician and activist, first lady from 1911 to 1913
- Sara Pérez (triathlete) (born 1988), Spanish triathlete and road cyclist
- Sara Pérez (volleyball), member of 2007 Women's European Volleyball Championship squads
- Sara Rojo Pérez (born 1973), Spanish painter and artist
