= Des Peres =

Des Peres may refer to:

- Des Peres, Missouri, a city in St. Louis County, Missouri
- Des Peres (band), a band from Australia
