= Moses Alexandrovich Press =

Russian engineer and technologist

Moses Alexandrovich Press (1861–1901) was a Russian engineer and technologist.

After passing through the St. Petersburg Institute of Technology, Press became a contributor to the Moskovski Journal Putei Soobshchenii and the journals of the Society of St. Petersburg Technologists. He died in Sankt Blasien in 1901. At the time of his death he was engaged in a work on the share of the Jews in the industries of western Russia (Voskhod, 1901, No. 17).
