= Perutz =

Perutz is a surname. Notable people with the surname include:

- Leo Perutz (1882–1957), Czech-Austrian novelist and mathematician
- Max Ferdinand Perutz (1914–2002), Austrian-British molecular biologist
- Robin Perutz (born 1949), son of Max, chemist
- Otto Perutz (1847–1922), Czech-German chemist

== See also ==
- Peretz
