= Pérez Pérez =

Village in Camagüey Province, Cuba

- Village
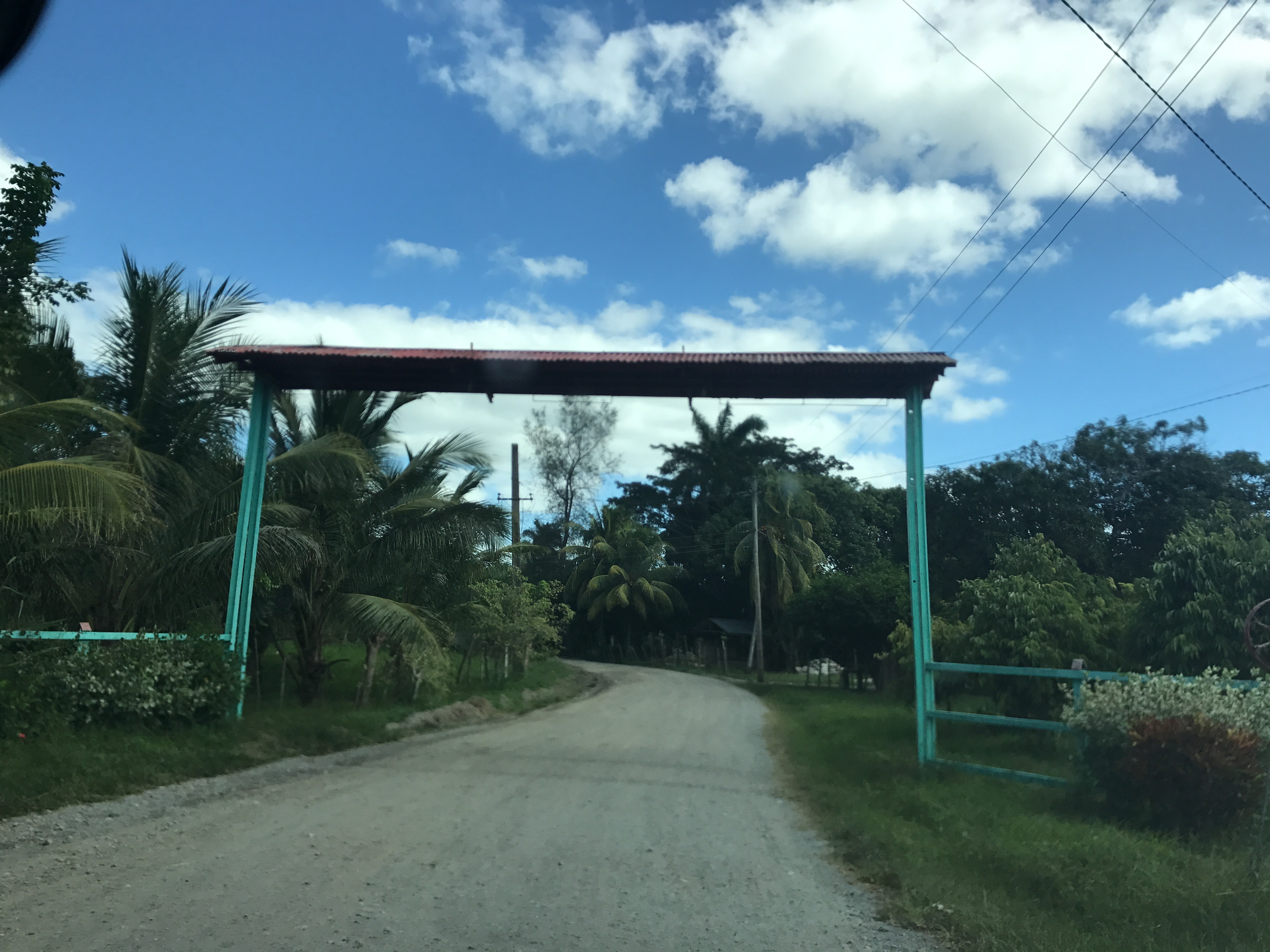
- Entrance of Perez Perez

- Location of Pérez Pérez in Cuba
- Coordinates: 21°28′50″N 78°10′39″W
- Country: Cuba
- Province: Camagüey
- Municipality: Florida
- Ward: Rolando Valdivia
- Elevation: 60 m (200 ft)

Population (2011)
  - Total: 76
- Time zone: UTC-5 (EST)
- Area code: +53-322

Pérez Pérez also known as La Pérez Pérez is a hamlet in the Camagüey Province of Cuba within the consejo popular (i.e. "ward") of Rolando Valdivia and the municipality of Florida, with an estimated population is 76.

== Overview ==
The village lies on the western portion of the province, located between Florida and Camaguey along the national highway "Carretera Central" (CC).

== Economy ==
The economy is primarily agricultural.

== Education ==
The rural school "Escuela Rural Eduardo Panizo Bustos" is the only school in the area.
