= Pauletta =

Pauletta is a surname. Notable people with the name include:

- Hubertson Pauletta (born 1989), Dutch Antillean footballer
- Ivan Pauletta (1936–2017), Istrian Italian politician, journalist and writer active in Croatia
