= José María Piriz =

Uruguayan footballer (born 1943)

José María Piriz (born April 1, 1943) is a former Uruguayan footballer who played for clubs in Uruguay, Chile and Ecuador.

== Career ==
Piriz was born in Rivera and played for Rampla Juniors. He transferred to Ecuadorian soccer in 1966 to play for Deportivo Quito.

The following year, he played in the Copa Libertadores de America with Emelec, where his performance impressed the manager of Colo-Colo of Chile who signed him up; he excelled in the 'Araucanian cacique'.

Despite this, Piriz had a reputation as an "evil genius" in the Chilean club, because, in a game against Rangers de Talca, he assaulted another player, Aldo Valentini. The conflict between the two 'colocolinos' was initiated by Piriz, who insulted Valentini. Piriz landed a severe blow on the other player. The referee Ricardo Romero, according to the regulations, sent off the Uruguayan player while Valentini spent several minutes trying to recover from the assault.

Piriz was nevertheless champion of Chilean soccer with Albos in 1970, playing alongside Carlos Caszely and Francisco Valdés.

== Teams ==
- (Uruguay) Rampla Juniors 1965
- (Ecuador) Deportivo Quito 1966
- (Ecuador) Emelec 1967
- (Chile) Colo-Colo 1968–1970
- (Ecuador) Emelec 1971–1974
- (Ecuador) LDU Portoviejo 1974
