= Ruvim =

Ruvim (Cyrillic: Рувим) or Rufim (Руфим), is a Christian name found in South and East Slavic cultures. It may refer to:

- Rufim Njeguš, Orthodox Metropolitan of Cetinje (1594–1636)
- Rufim Boljević, Orthodox Metropolitan of Cetinje (1662–73)
- Hadži-Ruvim (1752–1804), Orthodox archimandrite
- Ruvim Frayerman (1891–1972), Soviet writer
