= Perez (given name) =

Perez or Pérez is a male given name which may refer to:

- Perez (son of Judah), son of Judah and Tamar from the Old Testament of the Bible
- Perez Ahabwe (born 1961), Ugandan economist and politician
- Perez ben Elijah (died 1295), French tosafist
- Perez Benjamin (1791–1850), farmer and politician in Nova Scotia (in present-day Canada)
- Perez Hilton (born 1978), alias of celebrity blogger Mario Lavandeira
- Perez Morton (1751–1837), American lawyer and revolutionary patriot, Massachusetts Attorney General and Speaker of the Massachusetts House of Representatives
- Pérez Prado (1916–1989), Cuban musician (original first name, Dámaso Pérez)
- Perez M. Stewart (1858–1924), New York politician
- Perez Zagorin (1920–2009), American historian and professor
- Pérez Gil, a Spanish soldier in a local legend who mysteriously transported from Manila in the Philippines to the Plaza Mayor (now the Zócalo) in Mexico City.

== See also ==
- Paris (given name)
- Pérez (disambiguation)
- Pérez
