= Eury Pérez =

Eury Pérez may refer to:

- Eury Pérez (pitcher), baseball pitcher, born 2003
- Eury Pérez (outfielder), baseball outfielder, born 1990
