= Amal Peiris =

Sri Lankan cricketer (born 1985)

Personal information
- Full name: Amal Chinthaka Peiris
- Born: 7 June 1985 (age 41); Ratnapura, Sri Lanka
- Batting: Left-handed
- Bowling: Right-arm leg break
- Source: Cricinfo, 29 July 2020

Amal Peiris (Sinhala: අමල් පීරිස්; born 7 June 1985) is a Sri Lankan cricketer. He is a left-handed batsman and leg-break bowler who plays for Sebastianites Cricket and Athletic Club. He was born in Ratnapura.

Peiris made his cricketing debut in 2000, playing six matches in the ACC Under-15s Trophy, alongside such names as Upul Tharanga and Farveez Maharoof. Sri Lanka finished third in the table, behind finalists India and Pakistan.

Later in the same season, he played two games in the Costcutter Under-15s World Challenge, including one match against the tournament runners-up Pakistan.

Peiris made his first-class debut during the 2009–10 season, against Burgher Recreation Club, scoring 20 runs on his debut, and taking four wickets with the ball.
