= Peretz =

Peretz (Hebrew פרץ) is a Jewish given name and surname. Notable people with the name include:

== In the Hebrew Bible ==
- Perez (son of Judah) in the Book of Genesis, also written as Peretz, Perets, or Pharez

== Given name ==
- Peretz Hirshbein, (1880–1948), a Yiddish-language playwright
- Peretz Lavie (born 1949), Israeli expert in the psychophysiology of sleep and sleep disorders, the 16th president of the Technion - Israel Institute of Technology, Dean of the Rappaport Faculty of Medicine
- Peretz Markish, (1895–1952), a Soviet Yiddish-language poet.
- Peretz Rosenbaum, birth name of Paul Rand (1914–1996), American graphic designer.
- Peretz Smolenskin, (1842–1885), a Russian Jewish novelist

== Surname ==
- Amir Peretz (born 1952), former defense minister and Labor Party leader in Israel
- Daniel Peretz (born 2000), goalkeeper for FC Bayern Munich and the Israel national football team
- Isaac Leib Peretz (1852–1915), modernist Yiddish language author and playwright
- Isabelle Peretz (born 1956), Canadian professor of psychology researching music cognition and amusia
- Jesse Peretz (born 1968), rock video director and son of Martin
- Kobi Peretz (born 1975), Israeli singer
- Martin Peretz (born 1938), Harvard University lecturer and former owner of The New Republic
- Moshe Peretz (born 1983), Israeli singer-songwriter
- Omer Peretz (born 1986), Israel U21 footballer and son of Vicky
- Rafi Peretz (born 1956), Israeli Orthodox rabbi who served as Chief Military Rabbi and is now Education Minister of Israel
- Vicky Peretz (1953–2021), Israeli international footballer
- Yitzhak Peretz (born 1936), Israeli politician who served as Deputy Minister of Industry, Trade and Tourism.
- Yitzhak Peretz (born 1938), Israeli politician who served as Minister of Internal Affairs and of Immigrant Absorption, and member on Israeli Chief Rabbinate Council

== See also ==
- Pérès
- Pérez
- Perez
- Perec
- Perutz
- Píriz
