= Peres =

Peres is a patronymic Portuguese and Galician surname. Its modern variant is Pires.

There exists also a branch among Jewish people, not related with the first ones. In this case Hebrew: פרס, romanized: ˈperes is the name of the Bearded vulture or Gypaetus barbatus, commonly known as the lammergeier). However, the surname is from the son of Tamar and Judah, whose name means "bearded vulture". In the Hebrew Bible in the Book of Daniel, the words which form the "writing on the wall" at Belshazzar's feast are recorded initially as mene, mene, tekel, upharsin (Daniel 5:25) but the final word is given as peres in verse 28, where its meaning is said to be "Your kingdom has been divided, and given to the Medes and Persians".

People with the surname Peres include:

- Adans Lopez Peres (born 1975), Portuguese second husband of Princess Stéphanie of Monaco
- Asher Peres (1934–2005), Israeli physicist (born Aristide Pressman)
- Bernardo Peres da Silva (1775–1844), the only native governor of Portuguese India
- Christiana Ubach, née Peres (born 1987), Brazilian actress
- Fernando Pérez de Trava (c.1090-1155), Galician medieval nobleman
- Javier Peres (born 1972), American art dealer
- Marinho Peres (1947–2023), Brazilian footballer
- Paio Peres Correia (c. 1205–1275), Portuguese medieval nobleman
- Shimon Peres (1923–2016), Israeli politician (born Szymon Perski)
- Sonia Peres (1923–2011), Israeli first lady
- Tayla Peres (born 1991), Brazilian politician
- Valter Peres (born 1954), Brazilian footballer
- Waldir Peres (1951–2017), Brazilian footballer
- Vimara Peres (died 873), Galician medieval count and first Count of Portucale
- Peres (Portuguese footballer) (born 1939), full name António Francisco de Jesus Moreira, Portuguese football midfielder
- Peres (Brazilian footballer) (born 1974), full name Peres Spíndula de Oliveira, Brazilian football forward

== See also ==
- Pérès, French surname
- Des Peres (disambiguation)
- Pérez (disambiguation)
- Pires (disambiguation)
- Peiris, Sri Lankan version of Peres
- Peres–Horodecki criterion, a necessary condition in Quantum information theory
- Peres–Hussein London Agreement, between King Hussein of Jordan and Israeli Foreign Affairs Minister Shimon Peres
- River des Peres, an urban river in St. Louis, United States
- Peres Jepchirchir (born 1993), Kenyan runner and half marathon world champion
