= Pérez =

- Language: Spanish

Origin
- Meaning: Spanish: "Son of Pedro"
- Region of origin: Spain

Other names
- Variant forms: Spanish surnames: Pédrez, Perez, Peres, Peris, Peiris, Peiriz, Pires, Piriz, Pritz, Peters

Pérez is a very common Castilian Spanish surname of patronymic origin.

== Origins ==
The surname, written in Spanish orthography as Pérez, is a patronymic surname meaning "son of Pedro" ("Pero" in archaic Spanish), the Spanish equivalent of Peter. At the same time, the name Pedro derives from the Latin name Petrus, meaning "rock or stone". Among many other counterparts, some of its equivalents are Peres or Pires in Portuguese, Peris in Catalan, Peters in German, Petrović in Serbo-Croatian, Petrescu in Romanian and Peterson in English and Scandinavian languages.

== Pronunciation ==
In Castilian Spanish, the name is pronounced [ˈpeɾeθ] and in Hispanic America, [ˈpeɾes]. The accent or stress is placed on the first syllable. In English, on the contrary, it is usually pronounced with stress on the last syllable.

== List of persons with the surname ==
- Adolfo Pérez Esquivel (born 1931), Argentine activist
- Agustin Pérez (died 1286), Roman Catholic bishop
- Aharon Perez (died 1766), Tunisian rabbi
- Ailyn Pérez, American opera singer
- AJ Perez (1993–2011), Filipino actor
- AJ Perez (blogger) (born 1981), Filipino blogger
- Al Perez (born 1960), American professional wrestler
- Albino Pérez (died 1837), Mexican soldier and politician
- Álex Pérez (footballer, born 1991), Spanish footballer
- Alfonso Pérez (born 1949), Colombian boxer
- Alfredo Pérez (born 1952), Venezuelan boxer
- Alonso Pérez (1881–1914), Spanish painter
- Amalia Pérez (born 1977), Mexican powerlifter
- Amalia Pérez Díaz, Venezuelan actress
- Amanda Perez (born 1980), American R&B/Hip-Hop artist
- Amy Perez (born 1969), Filipino actress
- Ángel Pérez (volleyball) (born 1982), Puerto Rican volleyball player
- Antonio Pérez (1540–1611), Spanish statesman, secretary to King Philip II
- Antonio Pérez (born 1980), Dominican baseball player
- Antonio Pérez Delgadillo (born 1978), Mexican football goalkeeper
- Pitbull (born 1981, Armando Pérez), American rapper
- Arnaldo Pérez (born 1958), Puerto Rican swimmer
- Arturo Pérez-Reverte (born 1951), Spanish novelist and journalist
- Ashley Grace Pérez, American Latin pop singer, member of pop group Ha*Ash
- Augusto Pérez Palacios (1909–2002), Mexican architect
- Ayoze Pérez (born 1993), Spanish footballer
- Bartolomé Pérez (1634–1693), Spanish painter
- Belle Perez (born 1976), Belgian musician and songwriter
- Benito Pérez Galdós (1843–1920), Spanish novelist
- Bianca Jagger, (born 1945, Bianca Pérez-Mora), Nicaraguan social and human rights advocate
- Blanca Delia Pérez, Canary Islands politician
- Calixto Pérez (1949–2018), Colombian boxer
- Carla Pérez (born 1977), Brazilian dancer
- Carlos Pérez (born 1971), Dominican baseball player
- Carlos Pérez (catcher) (born 1990), Venezuelan baseball player
- Carlos Pérez (kayaker) (born 1979), Spanish kayaker
- Carlos Pérez de Bricio (1927–2022), Spanish businessman
- Carlos Andrés Pérez (1922–2010), President of Venezuela
- Carlota Pérez (born 1939), Venezuelan economist
- Carmen Victoria Pérez (1941-2019), Venezuelan television hostess and broadcaster
- Catalina Pérez (born 1989), Argentine footballer
- Catalina Pérez (born 1994), Colombian footballer
- Catalina Pérez Salinas, Chilean politician
- Chris Pérez (born 1969), American guitarist
- Chris Perez (baseball) (born 1985), American baseball player
- Chris Perez (gridiron football) (born 1969), American player of gridiron football
- Christian Perez (footballer born 1963), French soccer player
- Cionel Pérez (born 1996), Cuban baseball player
- Clara Perez (born 1981), Venezuelan actress
- Cristina Pérez (judge) (born 1968), American judge, host of Corte de Familia
- Cristina Pérez (reporter) (born 1973), Argentine television news journalist
- Dámaso Pérez Prado (1916–1989), Cuban composer
- Daniel Pérez (basketball) (born 1984), Paraguayan player
- Danilo Pérez (born 1965), Panamian pianist and composer
- Davide Perez (1711–1778), Italian composer
- Diego Pérez (footballer) (born 1980), Uruguayan footballer
- Diego Pérez (tennis) (born 1962), Uruguayan tennis player
- Eddie Perez (politician), American politician
- Eduardo Perez (born 1968), Venezuelan baseball player
- Eduardo Pérez (born 1969), American baseball player
- Eduardo Pérez Gonsalves (1933–2016), Spanish chess master
- Efrén Pérez Rivera (1929–2011), Puerto Rican environmentalist
- Elixabete Perez Gaztelu (born 1961), Basque linguist
- Elizabeth Pérez (born 1976), Venezuelan television journalist
- Emilio Pérez Touriño (born 1948), Spanish politician
- Emily Perez (1983–2006), American soldier, first female minority Command Sergeant at West Point
- Enrique López Pérez (born 1991), Spanish tennis player
- Erik Pérez (born 1989), Mexican mixed martial artist
- Esteban Pérez (born 1966), Argentine basketball player
- Eury Pérez (disambiguation), multiple people
- Felipe Pérez Roque (born 1965), Cuban politician, current foreign minister of the Republic of Cuba
- Félix Javier Pérez (1971–2005), Puerto Rican basketball player
- Fernando Perez (born 1983), American former Tampa Bay Rays outfielder, current San Francisco Giants coach
- Fruto Chamorro Pérez (1804–1855), Nicaraguan military scientist and politician
- Florentino Pérez (born 1947), Spanish businessman
- Francisco Pérez (baseball) (born 1997), Dominican baseball player
- Francisco Pérez Sierra (1627–1709), Spanish painter
- Francisco Rivera Pérez (1948–1984), Spanish bullfighter
- George Pérez (1954–2022), Puerto Rican-American illustrator and writer of comic books
- Glória Perez (born 1948), Brazilian screenwriter
- Gloria Osuna Perez (1947–1999), American artist
- Grant Perez (born 2001), Filipino-Australian singer and songwriter
- Héctor Amodio Pérez (born 1937), Uruguayan guerrilla fighter
- Hernán Pérez (born 1991), Venezuelan baseball player
- Henrique Pérez Dupuy (1881–1979), Venezuelan banker
- Hilda Pérez Carvajal (1945–2019), Venezuelan biologist
- Hugo Pérez (soccer) (born 1963), American international soccer player
- Hugo Pérez (footballer) (born 1968), Argentine international soccer player
- Ibán Pérez (born 1983), Spanish volleyball player
- Ion Perez (born 1990), Filipino actor, model and TV host
- Iván Pérez (born 1971), Cuban-born Spanish water polo player
- Jairo Pérez (cyclist) (born 1973), Colombian track and road cyclist
- Jairo Pérez (footballer) (born 1976), Colombian footballer
- Javier Pérez de Cuéllar (1920–2020), Peruvian diplomat, the fifth Secretary-General of the United Nations
- Jean-Claude Perez (born 1964), French politician
- Jefferson Pérez (born 1974), Ecuadorian track and field athlete
- Jeffrey Perez, American politician
- Jérôme Pérez (born 1982), French soccer player
- Jesús Pérez (boxer) (born 1971), Colombian boxer
- Jesús Pérez (cyclist) (born 1984), Venezuelan road cyclist
- Joe Perez (baseball) (born 1999), American baseball player
- Johan Pérez (born 1983), Venezuelan boxer
- Jorge M. Pérez (born 1949), Cuban American real estate developer
- Jose Perez (American football) (born 1985), American football player and former baseball player
- José Pérez (athlete), (born 1971), Cuban hurdler
- José Pérez (fencer) (born 1958), Spanish Olympic fencer
- José Pérez (pentathlete) (born 1928), Mexican Olympic modern pentathlete and fencer
- José Pérez (Venezuelan boxer) (born 1964), former Venezuelan boxer
- José Pérez Adán (born 1952), Spanish sociologist
- José Pérez Ferrada (born 1985), Chilean footballer
- José Pérez Francés (1936–2021), Spanish road racing cyclist
- José Pérez Reyes (born 1975), boxer from the Dominican Republic
- José Pérez Rosa, Puerto Rican senator and politician
- José Joaquín Pérez (1801–1889), Chilean political figure
- José Luis Pérez (equestrian) (born 1943), Mexican equestrian
- José María Pérez de Urdininea (1784–1865), president of Bolivia
- José Miguel Pérez (fencer) (1938–2024), Puerto Rican fencer
- José Miguel Pérez (triathlete) (born 1986), Spanish triathlete
- José Ricardo Pérez (born 1963), Colombian football defender
- Joseph Pérez (1931–2020), French historian specializing in Spanish history
- Juan Bautista Pérez (1869–1952), President of Venezuela
- Juan José Pérez Hernández (c. 1725–1775), Spanish explorer
- Juan Silvano Diaz Perez (1914–1969), Paraguayan chess master, poet, teacher, essayist and literary critic.
- Juan Vicente Pérez (1909-2024), Venezuelan supercentenarian
- Juan Pablo Pérez Alfonzo (1903–1979), Venezuelan diplomat, politician
- Julia Perez (1980–2017), Indonesian singer and actress
- Julia Pérez, later Marina Baura (born 1941), Venezuelan actress
- Junior Pérez (born 2001), Dominican baseball player
- Karlee Pérez (born 1986), ring name "Maxine", American professional wrestler, manager and authority figure
- Kenda Perez (born 1983), American model and host
- Kenneth Perez (born 1974), Danish football player
- Kevin Perez (born 1997), also known as Kay Flock, American rapper
- Kim Pérez (1941–2025), Spanish teacher and trans rights activist
- Laura Pérez Granel (born 1983), Spanish cartoonist and illustrator
- Laura Pérez Vernetti (born 1958), Spanish cartoonist and illustrator
- Leander Perez (1891–1969), Louisiana judge
- Lisandro Pérez (born 2000), Venezuelan footballer
- Louie Pérez (born 1953), American songwriter, percussionist and guitarist
- Lucas Pérez (born 1988), Spanish footballer
- Lucas Pérez Godoy (born 1993), Argentine footballer
- Luis Perez (American football) (born 1994), American football player
- Luis Pérez-Oramas (born 1960), Venezuelan poet, art historian and curator
- Luis Pérez-Sala (born 1959), Spanish race car driver.
- Luis Alberto Pérez-Rionda (born 1969), Cuban sprinter
- Luis Eladio Pérez, Colombian politician
- Luis Ernesto Pérez (born 1981), Mexican footballer
- Luisana Pérez, Venezuelan journalist
- Luisana Pérez (born 1976), Venezuelan table tennis player
- Manuel Perez (animator) (1914–1981), American animator
- Manuel Pérez (boxer) (born 1984), Mexican-American boxer
- Manuel Pérez (guerrilla leader) (died 1988), leader of the Colombian National Liberation Army from the 1970s to 1998
- Manuel Perez (musician) (1871–1946), American cornetist and bandleader
- Manuel Pérez (President of Nicaragua) (died 1852), President of Nicaragua 1843–1844
- Manuel Pérez (teacher) (1890–1951), Puerto Rican teacher and public servant
- Manuel Perez, Jr. (1923–1945), American soldier and Medal of Honor recipient
- V. Manuel Perez (born 1973), California State Assemblyman, 80th District
- Manuel Pérez Brunicardi (born 1978), Spanish ski mountaineer
- Manuel Pérez Flores (born 1980), Mexican footballer
- Marcos Pérez Jiménez (1914–2001), President of Venezuela 1952–1958
- María Dolores Pérez Enciso (1908–1949), Spanish-born Mexican writer and journalist
- María Pérez (born 2001), Spanish footballer who plays in the English, Women's Super League
- María Luisa Pérez Herrero (1898–1934), Spanish painter
- Mariano Ospina Pérez (1891–1976), President of Colombia 1946–1950
- Mariela Pérez Branger (born 1946), Venezuelan model
- Marina Pérez (born 1984), Spanish fashion model
- Mario Pérez Saldivar (born 1939), Mexican long-distance runner
- Mario Pérez Zúñiga (born 1982), Mexican footballer
- Martín Pérez (baseball) (born 1991), Venezuelan baseball player
- Matías Pérez Acuña (born 1994), Argentine footballer
- Mélido Pérez (born 1966), Dominican Republic baseball player
- Melina Perez (born 1979), American professional wrestler
- Mercedes Pérez (born 1987), Colombian weightlifter
- Mercedes Pérez Merino (born 1960), Spanish trade unionist and politician
- Michael Pérez (born 1992), Puerto Rican baseball player
- Miguel Perez (disambiguation), several people
- Montse Pérez (1956–2018), Catalan actress
- Narcisa Pérez Reoyo (1849–1876), Spanish writer
- Neifi Pérez (born 1973), Dominican Republic baseball player
- Ninoska Pérez Castellón, Cuban exile leader and radio host
- Odalis Pérez (1977–2022), Dominican Republic baseball player
- Óliver Pérez (born 1981), Mexican baseball player
- Orlando Perez (born 1977), American soccer player
- Óscar Pérez Bovela (born 1981), Spanish football player
- Óscar Pérez Rojas (born 1973), Mexican football player
- Otto Pérez Molina (born 1950), Guatemalan politician, retired military and the President of Guatemala
- Pablo Pérez Álvarez (born 1969), Venezuelan lawyer, politician and former Governor of Zulia State
- Pascual Pérez (boxer) (1926–1977), Argentine flyweight
- Patricia Pérez (footballer) (born 1978), Mexican female footballer
- Patricia Pérez (born 2004), Spanish rhythmic gymnast
- Pedro Pérez (1952–2018), Cuban triple jumper
- Quinnie Perez, American farmworker and politician
- Rafael Pérez (baseball) (born 1982), Mexican baseball player
- Rafael Pérez Pareja (1836–1897), president of Ecuador
- Ramón Ovidio Pérez Morales (born 1932), Venezuelan Roman Catholic archbishop
- Ricardo Pérez Godoy (1905–1982), Peruvian politician, President of the Military Junta
- Richard Ray Perez, American film producer and director
- Robert Pérez (baseball) (born 1969), Venezuelan baseball player
- Robert Pérez Palou (born 1948), Spanish painter
- Roberto Pérez (born 1988), Puerto Rican baseball player
- Rodolfo Pérez (field hockey) (born 1967), Argentine field hockey player
- Rolando Perez, American mixed martial artist
- Romina Pérez (born 1958), Bolivian politician
- Rosie Perez (born 1964), American actress, dancer, choreographer and director
- Rubby Pérez (1956–2025), Dominican merengue singer
- Rudy Pérez (born 1958), Cuban-American composer and producer
- Salvador Pérez (born 1990), Venezuelan baseball player
- Sara Pérez (disambiguation)
- Sébastien Pérez (born 1973), French soccer player
- Sergio Pérez (born 1990), Mexican Formula One driver
- Silverio Pérez (born 1948), Puerto Rican entertainer
- Silverio Pérez (bullfighter) (1915–2006), Mexican bullfighter
- Taylor Zakhar Perez (born 1991), American actor
- Thierry Perez (born 1966), French politician
- Thomas Perez (born 1961), United States Secretary of Labor
- Tomás Pérez (born 1973), Venezuelan baseball player
- Tony Pérez (born 1942), Cuban-American baseball player
- Vicente Pérez Rosales (1807–1886), Chilean colonization agent
- Victor Perez (1911–1945), Tunisian Jewish world champion flyweight boxer
- Victor Perez (born 1992), French professional golfer
- Vincent Pérez (born 1964), Swiss actor
- Wenceel Pérez (born 1999), Dominican baseball player
- Williams Pérez (born 1991), Venezuelan baseball player
- Wilson Pérez (born 1967), Colombian football defender
- Xavier Pérez (born 1968), Andorran cyclist
- Xavier Pérez Grobet (born 1964), Mexican cinematographer
- Yolanda Pérez (born 1983), Mexican-American singer who specializes in banda music
- Yorkis Pérez (born 1967), Dominican Republic baseball player

== See also ==
- Peiris
- Perez (given name)
- Perez., an Italian neo-noir film
