= Mevan Pieris =

Sri Lankan cricketer (born 1946)

Mevan Pieris මෙවන් පීරිස්
Personal information
- Full name: Henry Sri Mevan Pieris
- Born: 16 February 1946 (age 80)
- Batting: Left-handed
- Bowling: Right-arm fast-medium

International information
- National side: Sri Lanka (1975)
- ODI debut (cap 7): 7 June 1975 v West Indies
- Last ODI: 14 June 1975 v Pakistan

Career statistics
Competition	ODI	FC	LA
Matches	3	15	6
Runs scored	19	355	37
Batting average	9.50	19.72	9.25
100s/50s	0/0	0/2	0/0
Top score	16	50*	16
Balls bowled	132	2,698	312
Wickets	2	61	5
Bowling average	67.50	17.42	48.20
5 wickets in innings	0	2	0
10 wickets in match	0	0	0
Best bowling	2/68	6/25	2/31
Catches/stumpings	0/–	8/–	0/–
- Source: ESPNcricinfo, 25 December 2014

Henry Sri Mevan Pieris (born 16 February 1946) is a former Sri Lankan cricketer who played first-class and one-day cricket for Sri Lanka from 1970 to 1975.

== Life and career ==
Mevan Pieris was born in Colombo and attended S. Thomas' College, Mount Lavinia, and The University of Colombo, where he studied Science. A right-arm fast-medium bowler and useful left-handed lower-order batsman, he was an expert swing bowler who took wickets consistently for Sri Lankan teams. In the 1969-70 Gopalan Trophy match he made 50 and 50 not out and took 5 for 55 and 1 for 8, bowling all six of his victims. He took 6 for 25 when the Sri Lanka Board President's XI dismissed Pakistan Under-25s for 85 in 1973–74.

Pieris played three One Day International matches at the inaugural World Cup in 1975. An injury to the cartilage in his left knee forced him to quit cricket after the World Cup at the age of 29.

He has worked in industry and academia, teaching Chemistry and specialising in polymers. He served as President of the Plastics and Rubber Institute and President of the Institute of Chemistry Ceylon. In September 2018, he was one of 49 former Sri Lankan cricketers felicitated by Sri Lanka Cricket, to honour them for their services before Sri Lanka became a full member of the International Cricket Council (ICC). He and his wife have a son and a daughter.
