= Pérès =

Pérès is a French surname derived from Gascon language

== Etymology ==
From Gascon language péré and mostly its plural form pérès, meaning pear trees.

== Surname ==
People with the surname Pérès include:

- Jean-Baptiste Pérès, French physicist
- Joseph Pérès, French mathematician
- Gil-Pérès, real name Jules-Charles Pérès Jolin, French stage actor and vaudevilliste
- Marcel Pérès, French musicologist, composer, choral director and singer
- Marcel Pérès (actor), French actor

== See also ==
- Peres
