= Píriz =

Píriz or Piriz is a surname. Notable people with the surname include:

- Conduelo Píriz (1905–1976), Uruguayan footballer
- Emily Piriz (born 1996), American singer
- Facundo Píriz (born 1990), Uruguayan footballer
- Jonathan Píriz (born 1986), Uruguayan footballer
- José María Piriz (born 1943), Uruguayan footballer
- Juan Píriz (1902–1946), Uruguayan footballer
- Sebastián Píriz (born 1990), Uruguayan footballer
- Víctor Píriz (born 1980), Uruguayan footballer
