= Ruwin Peiris =

Sri Lankan cricketer (born 1970)

Cricket information
- Batting: Left-handed
- Bowling: Slow left-arm orthodox

Career statistics
Competition	First-class	List A
Matches	129	72
Runs scored	6,606	1,948
Batting average	33.70	30.43
100s/50s	10/35	2/11
Top score	139	115*
Balls bowled	1,142	381
Wickets	23	11
Bowling average	24.52	19.18
5 wickets in innings	0	0
10 wickets in match	0	0
Best bowling	4/33	3/12
Catches/stumpings	112/–	20/–
- Source: CricketArchive, 10 October 2022

Gorakanage Ruwin Prasantha Peiris (born 9 August 1970) is a Sri Lankan first-class cricketer who plays in the Premier Trophy.

A left-handed batsman, Peiris has made over 6000 runs in Sri Lankan domestic cricket with 10 hundreds. He played with Tamil Union Cricket and Athletic Club from 1992 to 2001/02 before joining Moors Sports Club.
