= Pirez =

Pirez may refer to:

- João Pirez (fl. 1548), Portuguese nobleman
- Jhon Pírez (born 1993), Uruguayan footballer
- Leandro González Pírez (born 1992), Argentine footballer

== See also ==
- Piréz people, a fictional nation invented by Tárki, a Hungarian polling company, to measure attitudes regarding immigration
