= Petter (given name) =

- Gender: Male
- Language: Norwegian, Swedish
- Name day: 29 June (Norway)

Origin
- Region of origin: Scandinavia

Other names
- Related names: Per, Peter, Peder, Pelle, Pehr, Pär, Pälle

Petter is a predominantly Scandinavian masculine given name, found mostly in Norway and Sweden and to a much lesser extent in Denmark. It is a cognate of the name Peter.

Individuals bearing the name Petter include:

- Petter (rapper) (born 1974), Swedish rapper
- Petter Andersen (born 1974), Norwegian speed skater
- Petter Andersson (born 1985), Swedish footballer
- Petter Augustsson (born 1980), Swedish footballer
- Petter Belsvik (born 1967), Norwegian footballer and coach
- Petter Jakob Bjerve (1913–2004), Norwegian economist, statistician and politician
- Petter Bjørheim (born 1965), Norwegian politician
- Petter Bruer Hanssen (born 1986), Norwegian footballer
- Petter Dass (c. 1647–1707), Norwegian Lutheran priest and poet
- Petter Eide (born 1959), Norwegian politician
- Petter Eldh (born 1983), Swedish jazz bass player and composer
- Petter Eliassen (born 1985), Norwegian cross-country skier
- Petter Emanuelsson (born 1991), Swedish ice hockey player
- Petter Johnsen Ertzgaard (1784–1848), Norwegian politician and military officer
- Petter Fagerhaug (born 1997), Norwegian cyclist
- Petter Fauchald (1930–2013), Norwegian footballer
- Petter Fladeby (born 1961), Danish film sound designer and mixer
- Petter Røste Fossen (born 1991), Norwegian ice hockey player
- Petter Furberg (1923–1999), Norwegian politician
- Petter Furuseth (born 1978), Norwegian footballer
- Petter Gottschalk (born 1950), Norwegian business theorist and professor
- Petter Granberg (born 1992), Swedish ice hockey player
- Petter Graver (1920–1995), Norwegian jurist and diplomat
- Petter Gustafsson (born 1985), Swedish footballer
- Petter Hagberg (alias of Brita Hagberg; 1756– 1825), Swedish woman who disguised herself as a man served as a soldier in the Swedish Army during the Russo-Swedish War
- Petter Hansen, Norwegian ten-pin bowler
- Petter Hansson (born 1976), Swedish footballer
- Petter Hansson (born 1996), Swedish ice hockey player
- Petter Hemming (born 1999), Finnish footballer
- Petter Henriksen (born 1949), Norwegian musician and publisher
- Petter Hol (1883–1981), Norwegian gymnast
- Petter Hugsted (1921–2000), Norwegian ski jumper
- Petter Jamvold (1899–1961), Norwegian sport sailor
- Petter Jansen (born 1955), Norwegian businessman
- Petter Karlsson (born 1977), Swedish rock instrumentalist and singer (Therion, Diablo Swing Orchestra, Snowy Shaw)
- Petter Adolf Karsten (1834–1917), Finnish mycologist
- Petter Kristiansen (alias Katastrofe; born 1989), Norwegian singer-songwriter
- Petter Larsen (1890–1946), Norwegian sport sailor
- Petter Lennartsson (born 1988), Swedish footballer
- Petter Lie (1835–1917), Norwegian sailor and fisherman
- Petter Lindström (1907–2000), Swedish-American neurosurgeon and former husband of actress Ingrid Bergman
- Petter Løvik (1949–2007), Norwegian politician
- Petter Martinsen (1887–1972), Norwegian gymnast
- Petter Mejlænder (born 1952), Norwegian journalist, author and translator
- Petter Menning (born 1987), Swedish sprint canoer
- Petter Meyer (born 1985), Finnish footballer
- Petter Moe-Johansen (also known as P. Petter Moe-Johansen; 1882–1952), Norwegian newspaper editor and politician
- Petter Moen (1901–1944), Norwegian Resistance member during WWII
- Petter Vaagan Moen (born 1984), Norwegian footballer
- Petter Morottaja (born 1982), Finnish Inari Sámi language author
- Petter Myhre (born 1972), Norwegian footballer
- Petter Næss (born 1960), Norwegian actor and film director
- Petter Nilssen (1869–1939), Norwegian master watchmaker and politician
- Petter Nome (born 1954), Norwegian journalist and television presenter
- Petter Northug (born 1986), Norwegian cross-country skier
- Petter Øgar (born 1953), Norwegian physician and civil servant
- Petter Olsen (born 1948), Norwegian businessman
- Petter Mathias Olsen (born 1998), Norwegian footballer
- Petter Olson (born 1991), Swedish decathlete
- Petter Øverby (born 1992), Norwegian handball player
- Petter Mørland Pedersen (born 1984), Norwegian sport sailor
- Petter Pettersson (born 1939), Norwegian writer journalist
- Petter Pettersson Jr. (1911–1984), Norwegian politician
- Petter Pilgaard (born 1980), Norwegian television personality
- Petter Planke (born 1937), Norwegian businessman
- Petter Carl Reinsnes (1904–1976), Norwegian politician
- Petter Rönnquist (born 1973), Swedish ice hockey player
- Petter Rudi (born 1973), Norwegian footballer
- Petter Salsten (born 1965), Norwegian ice hockey player, coach and sports official
- Petter Schjerven (born 1967), Norwegian television host
- Petter Schramm (1946–2014), Norwegian poet
- Petter Sevel (born 1974), Norwegian footballer
- Petter Christian Singsaas (born 1972), Norwegian footballer
- Petter Skarheim (born 1962), Norwegian civil servant
- Petter Solberg (born 1974), Norwegian rally and rallycross driver
- Petter Solli (born 1966), Norwegian footballer
- Petter Steen Jr. (born 1962), Norwegian politician
- Petter Stenborg (1719–1781), Swedish actor and theater director
- Petter Stordalen (born 1962), Norwegian businessman
- Petter Strand (born 1994), Norwegian footballer
- Petter Stymne (born 1983), Swedish swimmer
- Petter C. G. Sundt (1945–2007), Norwegian shipping magnate and businessman
- Petter Tande (born 1985), Norwegian Nordic combined skier
- Petter Thoresen (born 1961), Norwegian ice hockey player and coach
- Petter Thoresen (born 1966), Norwegian orienteer
- Petter Thomassen (1941–2003), Norwegian politician
- Petter Vågan (born 1982), Norwegian singer-songwriter and guitarist
- Petter Vennerød (1948–2021), Norwegian film director
- Petter Villegas (born 1975), Ecuadorian-American footballer
