= Raid on Boulogne =

1804 raid during the Napoleonic Wars

- Part of the Napoleonic Wars
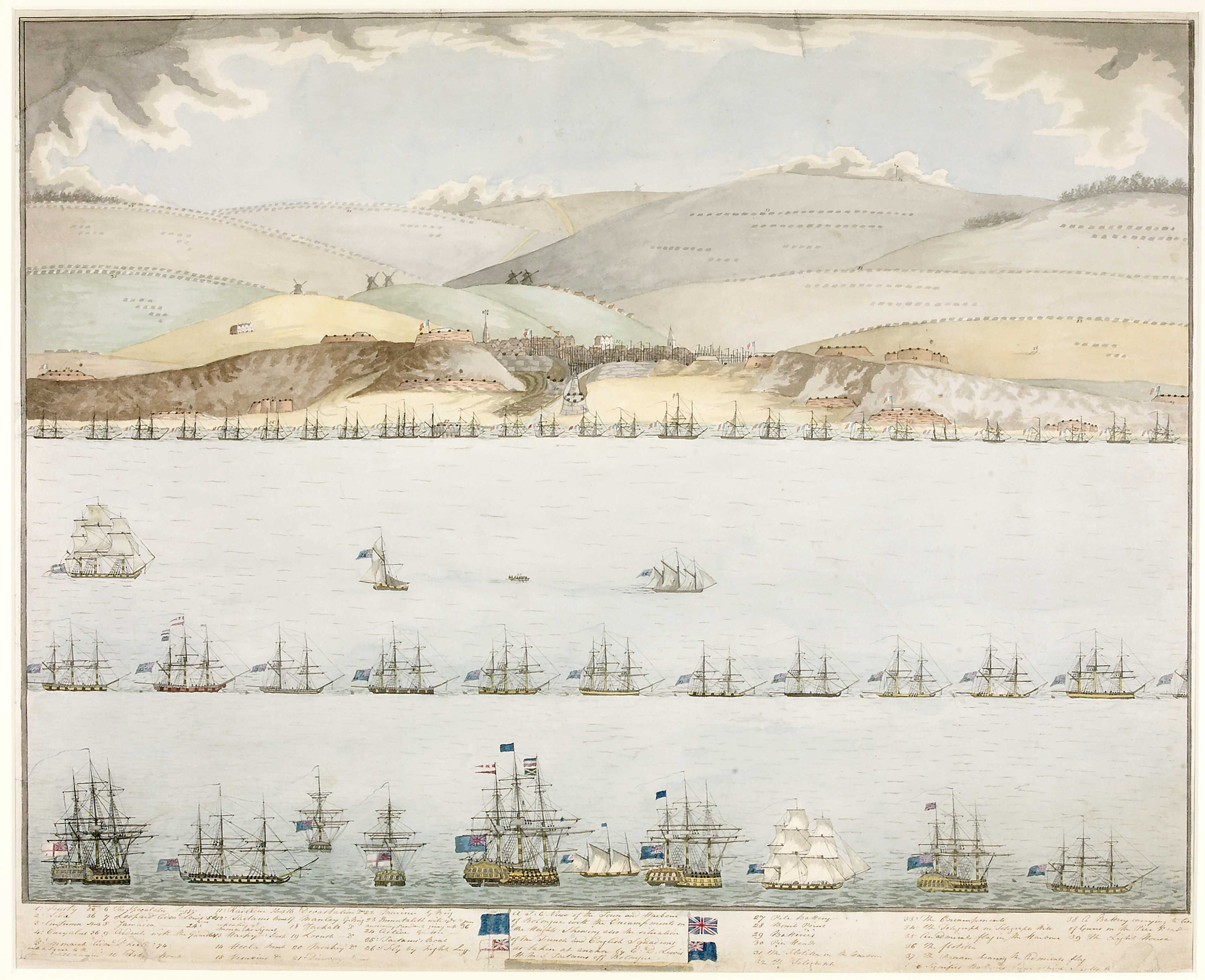
- Plan and key. The Attack on Boulogne Oct 1804, watercolour by E. D. Lewis (HMS Tartarus))
| Date | 2–3 October 1804 |
| Location | Boulogne-sur-Mer, France 50°43′31″N 1°36′48″E |
| Result | See Aftermath |

Belligerents
| United Kingdom | France |

Commanders and leaders
| (United Kingdom) Lord Keith (United Kingdom of Great Britain and Ireland) Sidney Smith | |

Casualties and losses
| Unknown | 1 ship lost |

The raid on Boulogne in 1804 was a naval assault by elements of the Royal Navy on the fortified French port of Boulogne-sur-Mer, during the Napoleonic Wars. It differed from the conventional tactics of naval assaults of the period by utilizing a wide range of new equipment produced by the American inventor Robert Fulton, with the backing of the Admiralty. Despite its ambitious aims the assault produced little material damage to the French fleet anchored in the harbour, but did perhaps contribute to a growing sense of defeatism amongst the French as to their chances of crossing the English Channel in the face of the Royal Navy and launching a successful invasion of the United Kingdom.

== Prelude ==
=== Boulogne and the Armée de l'Angleterre ===
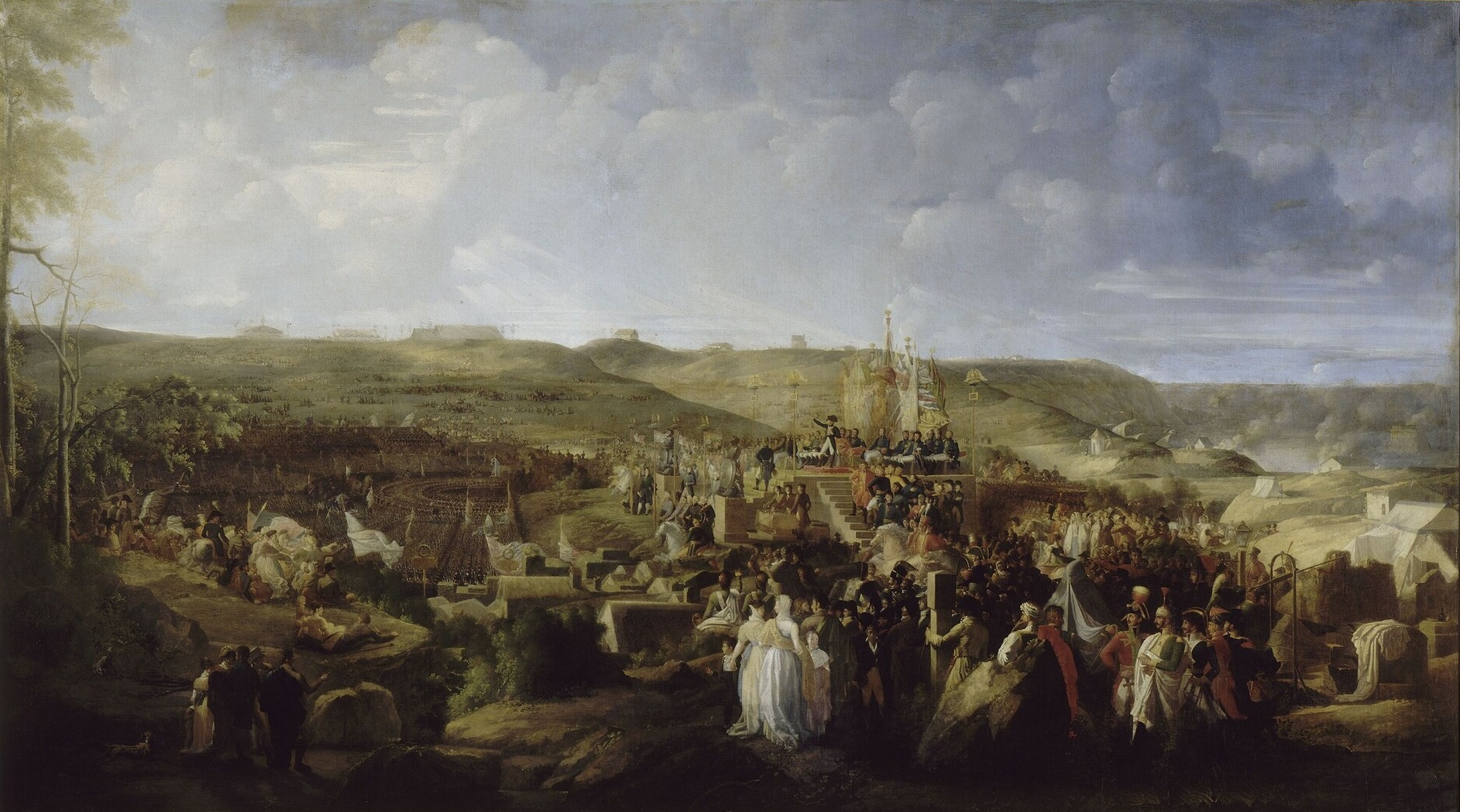
Napoleon Distributing the Legion of Honour at the Camp of Boulogne by Philippe-Auguste Hennequin

Napoleon had marked out the Channel port of Boulogne as one of the main embarkation points for his Armée de l'Angleterre. Preparations for an invasion flotilla to carry French troops across the Channel from a number of ports had been underway since the late 1790s, but had been temporarily shelved by the Peace of Amiens. The resumption of hostilities resulted in the gathering of forces outside Boulogne, the construction of large military camps and the fortification of port in preparation for the assembling of the invasion flotilla. Napoleon himself visited the town on 16 August 1804 to review the troops and present medals. The Royal Navy was the main obstacle to a successful invasion, but Napoleon declared that his fleet need only be "masters of the Channel for six hours, and we shall be masters of the world." Meanwhile, British land-based defences were under-prepared and ill-equipped to resist an invasion force numbering upwards of 100,000 men. Unless the French invasion fleet could be destroyed either in port or at sea, it was doubtful that the south of the country could be held in the immediate aftermath of a landing and advance on London. Though the intended departure points were known and were being closely blockaded by the Royal Navy, First Lord of the Admiralty Lord Melville was short of ships. If a combined Franco-Spanish fleet were to force the Navy from its station for even a short while, the French invasion force might succeed in crossing unmolested.

With tensions running high in Britain, prominent politicians suggested attacking the French force in port, in the hopes of at the very least delaying the anticipated invasion while defences were hurriedly constructed along the coast. Boulogne had been heavily fortified over the years, and a number of conventional assaults had already failed, notable being one commanded by Horatio Nelson in 1801. The invasion barges were defended by a double line of warships anchored nose-to-tail, with these covered by gun batteries lining the cliff tops. New methods had to be considered.

=== British plans for attack ===
Prime Minister William Pitt the Younger met with a number of inventors and amateur tacticians during the year, who proposed new and novel ways of attacking the French before they could put to sea. Ideas included sinking blockships in the harbour mouth, releasing rocket-carrying balloons over the port at night to be detonated by clockwork, or sending in a fleet of fireships. On 20 July 1804 Pitt and Sir Home Riggs Popham met with American inventor Robert Fulton. Fulton had been working in France designing submarines, but having failed to generate any real interest in the French Navy for the practical application of his inventions, Fulton had come to Britain and offered his services to the Admiralty. He proposed an assault using a combination of fireships, torpedoes, mines and other explosive devices, a concept that Pitt agreed to. A contract was signed and Fulton was tasked with working with the Admiralty to build his devices in anticipation of an assault later that year.

== Preparations ==
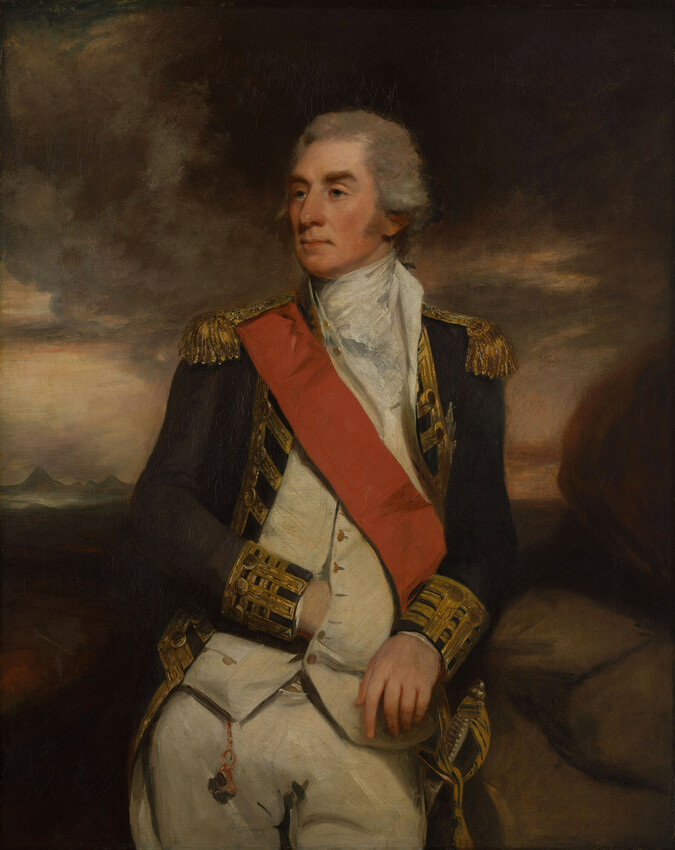
Lord Keith, the commander of British forces during the raid

Napoleon left Boulogne on 27 August, bound for Aachen to visit the tomb of Charlemagne, and to see his wife Joséphine. The army remained encamped outside Boulogne and the British were initially suspicious that his departure was a ruse, and that he would double back unexpectedly to take command of the army and launch the invasion. In the meantime the frigate HMS Immortalite was sent under the command of Captain Edward Owen to carry out surveys along the French coast around the port. Fulton subsequently pronounced his inventions ready, and an assault was planned for early October. Working at Portsmouth Dockyard Fulton had built several types of craft and explosive devices. The 'torpedo-catamaran' was a coffer-like device balanced on two wooden floats and steered by a man with a paddle. Weighted with lead so as to ride low in the water, the operator was further disguised by wearing dark clothes and a black cap. His task was to approach the French ship, hook the torpedo to the anchor cable and, having activated the device by removing a pin, remove the paddles and escape before the torpedo detonated. Also to be deployed were large numbers of casks filled with gunpowder, ballast and combustible balls. They would float in on the tide and on washing up against an enemy's hull, explode. Also included in the force were several fireships, carrying 40 barrels of gunpowder and rigged to explode by a clockwork mechanism.

The force assembled outside Boulogne in later September, under the overall command of Lord Keith aboard his flagship HMS Monarch. There to witness the operation were Lord Melville and Fulton. Fulton had negotiated a sum of £40,000 for the first decked ship destroyed in the attack, and half the value of any ship destroyed, on top of his salary of £200 a month. However Keith made no attempt to conceal the British force, and the French were alerted that an attack could be imminent. By 9pm on the night of 2 October the wind and tide were judged right and the flotilla began to approach the harbour.

== Raid ==
The British approached in three divisions. The fireships were escorted in by several gun-brigs, accompanied by Fulton's torpedo-catamarans, up to 18 in total. The French had responded to the increased British forces by anchoring their line of frigates further inshore, and deploying a protective line of pinnaces. The French sentries soon spotted the approaching ships and opened fire. Abandoning any hope of achieving surprise the crews on the fireships steered full ahead, set the mechanisms and abandoned ship. The results were visually spectacular but achieved little. One fireship exploded in the gap between two frigates, another passed between the French line and exploded beyond it. Another was stopped by a French pinnace, whose crew boarded it and began to search it. While they were doing this it blew up, killing the French aboard it, and destroying the pinnace alongside. This was the only success of the night; neither the torpedo catamarans nor the exploding casks achieved any successes. The British remained in action until 4am the next morning, when a gale forced them to seek shelter in the Downs.

== Aftermath ==
The action had achieved disappointingly little as far as the British were concerned. Fulton claimed that his machines had not been used properly, and began to refine them to make them easier to handle. Keith, who had been skeptical from the start, was sympathetic, considering that they had been unlucky and that another attempt might bring greater success. Melville acknowledged this, but noted that the attack had had psychological implications, by spreading panic amongst the French. The French began to construct a series of booms and chains across the entrance to frustrate similar attacks in the future, which took time and put them in a defensive rather than offensive mode of thinking. By now the winter weather had arrived, and all thoughts of invasion had to be postponed until the spring 1805 at the earliest. The nature of the devices used in the attack provoked derision from much of the British public, who regarded it as an unfair and unsporting method of waging war. Fulton made another attempt to use his devices against the fleet at Boulogne on 19 September 1805, this time in company with Sir Sidney Smith, but again the attack did not produce any significant results.
