= Pär =

Pär is a given name, a Scandinavian form of Peter. Notable people with the name include:

- Pär Arlbrandt (born 1982), Swedish former professional ice hockey forward
- Pär Arvidsson (born 1960), former butterfly swimmer from Sweden
- Pär Asp (born 1982), retired Swedish footballer
- Pär Bäcker (born 1982), Swedish professional ice hockey player
- Pär Aron Borg (1776–1839), Swedish pedagogue and a pioneer in the education for the blind and deaf
- Pär Boström
- Pär Cederqvist (born 1980), Swedish footballer
- Pär Djoos (born 1968), former ice hockey defenceman
- Pär Edblom (born 1985), Swedish former ice hockey player
- Pär Edlund (born 1967), retired Swedish ice hockey player
- Pär Edwardson (born 1963), Swedish musician, songwriter and producer
- Pär Ericsson (born 1988), Swedish footballer
- Pär Gerell (born 1982), Swedish table tennis player
- Pär Granstedt (born 1945), Swedish politician
- Pär Gustafsson (born 1983), Swedish politician
- Pär Götrek
- Pär Hallström (born 1947), Swedish legal writer and professor emeritus of Law
- Pär Hansson (born 1986), Swedish football goalkeeper
- Pär Hurtig (born 1957), Swedish rower
- Pär Hållberg
- Pär Jilsén (born 1960), Swedish former handball player
- Pär Johansson (born 1970), Swedish screenwriter, lecturer, theatre producer and theatre director
- Pär-Gunnar Jönsson (born 1963), retired badminton player from Sweden
- Pär Lagerkvist (1891–1974), Swedish author who received the Nobel Prize in Literature in 1951
- Pär Lernström (born 1980), Swedish television presenter
- Pär Lindgren (born 1952), Swedish composer and composition teacher
- Pär Lindh, founding member of the Swedish symphonic rock group Pär Lindh Project
- Pär Lindholm (born 1991), Swedish professional ice hockey centre
- Pär Lindström (born 1970), Swedish freestyle swimmer
- Pär Lindén (born 1966), Swedish sprint canoer
- Pär Lund (born 1972), Swedish pianist and composer
- Pär Mikaelsson (born 1970), retired ice hockey player
- Pär Millqvist
- Pär Mårts (born 1953), retired Swedish ice hockey player, retired coach of Swedish National team
- Pär Öberg
- Pär Rådström (1925–1963), Swedish writer and journalist
- Pär Axel Sahlberg (born 1954), Swedish politician
- Pär Olof Sandå (born 1965), Swedish entrepreneur, developer and stock trader
- Pär Stenbäck (born 1941), Finnish politician and debater
- Pär Styf (born 1979), retired ice hockey defenceman
- Pär Sundström (born 1981), Swedish bassist of power metal band Sabaton
- Pär Wiksten
- Pär Zetterberg (born 1970), Swedish former football midfielder

== See also ==
- Per
- Pehr
- Peter
