= Pär Edwardson =

Swedish musician

- Born: Pär Edwardson; 29 January 1963 (age 62); Gothenburg, Sweden
- Occupation: Songwriter

Pär Edwardson (born 29 January 1963 in Västra Frölunda in Gothenburg) is a Swedish musician, songwriter and producer. Together with Håkan Svensson (Nationalteatern) he is the owner of BongoRecordings Studio in Gothenburg.

Pär Edwardson's first CD in his own name, Bodybuilding - but with centimetre?, came in 2005. His second album, PearShaped, was released in August 2015.

He has worked as musician and producer with, among others, Carola Häggkvist, Max Martin, Road Ratt, Biscaya, Mattias Eklundh, Kee Marcello, Jenny Willén, Lasse Kronér, Peter Apelgren, Stonecake, Dance With A Stranger, Mary Beats Jane, Psychotic Youth, E8 Profilensemble, Ole Edvard Antonsen, Bjørn Nessjø and Björn Rosenström.

== Discography, selected (as producer) ==
- Pagan Pagan 1988 (US 18)
- Psychotic Youth ...be in the sun 1992 (Radium Records/MNW RA 80 (LP) RACD 80 (CD)
- Pagan The Weight 1992 - co-producer with Martin Hedström (Alpha Records ALCB-860)
- Road Ratt Road Ratt 1993 (Reel CD 2 Reel Records/MNW)
- Triple & Touch T & T 1993 (Musik/Musik MM 11 Distribution EMI)
- It's Alive Earthquake Vision 1993 - 1 song (Cheiron/BMG 74321-16144 2)
- Million We, Ourselves & Us 1994 (KMC MM 94200)
- Stonecake In the Middle of Nowhere 1995 (MVG 119/MNW)
- Psychotic Youth Small Wonders 1996 (MNW CD 276)
- Human Race For the Sake of Our Soul 1998 (Z-Records 1997003)
- Mattias Rust Om några år 1999 (Sheriff Records SRCDS 188)
- Triple & Touch Stereo 2001 (Border Music Trecs 001)
- Frälsningsarmén with Thomas von Brömsen and Triple & Touch I goda händer 2001 (FACD 021)
- Björn Rosenström Glove Sex Guy 2001 (CDBR 101)
- Jenny Willén Påtår 2001 (Zebra Art Records ZAR 961)
- Jenny Willén Nu börjar det roliga 2003 (Zebra Art Records ZAR 962)
- Mette Sommer Another Step 2004 (Rekord Records Rek 002)
- Adam Thompson Reconnected 2004 (Distributed by own company in Melbourne. Thompson was frontman in the band Chocolate Starfish)
- Björn Rosenström Syster Gunbritts Hemlighet 2006 - co-producer with Håkan Svensson (own company)

== Discography (as artist) ==
- Biscaya - as Biscaya 1983 (RCA PL 70034 (LP))
- On 45 - as Biscaya EP, 1984 (PG 70466) Biscaya (both) on CD Eternal Masterworks BMG BVCM-37859)
- The Best of Miracles 2004 (Rek 003)
- Bodybuilding - but with centimetre? 2005 (Rek 001)
- PearShaped 2015 (Rekord Records)
