= Mikaelsson =

Mikaelsson is a Swedish surname. Notable people with the surname include:

- John Mikaelsson (1913–1987), Swedish race walker
- Pär Mikaelsson (born 1970), Swedish ice hockey player (retired)
- Sven Mikaelsson (born 1943), Swedish alpine skier
- Tobias Mikaelsson (born 1988), Swedish football player
