= Per (given name) =

- Pronunciation: Swedish: [ˈpæːr] Norwegian: [ˈpeːr, ˈpæːr] Danish: [ˈpʰɛɐ̯]
- Gender: Male

Origin
- Origin: Greek
- Meaning: stone
- Region of origin: Scandinavia

Other names
- Related names: Peter, Peer, Pär, Pedro, Pierre, Piotr, Petra, Piers, Peder, Pietro

Per is a Scandinavian masculine given name. It is derived from Greek Πέτρος, Petros (an invented, masculine form of Greek petra, the word for "rock" or "stone"). The name is a variant of Peter, a common masculine name of the same origin. Other Scandinavian variants of Per are Pehr, Peer and Pär.

== A–B ==
- Per Aabel (1902–1999), Norwegian comic actor
- Per Almar Aas (1929–2014), Norwegian politician
- Per Ahlmark (1939–2018), Swedish writer and former politician
- Per Egil Ahlsen (born 1958), retired Norwegian footballer
- Per Aldeheim (born 1966), Swedish guitarist, songwriter, and producer
- Per Almaas (1898–1991), Norwegian politician
- Per Almqvist (born 1978), Swedish singer-songwriter
- Per Andersen (1930–2020), Norwegian brain researcher
- Per Thomas Andersen (1954–2023), Norwegian literary historian and novelist
- Per Anger (1913–2002), Swedish diplomat
- Per Ankersjö (born 1971), Swedish politician
- Per Ankre (born 1948), Norwegian handball player
- Per Arneberg (1901–1981), Norwegian poet and translator
- Per Arnoldi (born 1941), Danish artist
- Per Asplin (1928–1996), Norwegian singer, composer, and actor
- Per Daniel Amadeus Atterbom (1790–1855), Swedish poet
- Per Aunet (born 1940), Norwegian politician and former athlete
- Per Bak (1948–2002), Danish theoretical physicist
- Per Bakken (1882–1958), Norwegian Nordic skier
- Per Bang (1922–2010), Norwegian journalist
- Per Bauhn (born 1960), Swedish philosopher and author
- Per Bengtsson (born 1967), Swedish speedskater
- Per Aage Brandt (1944–2021), Danish writer, poet, and linguist
- Per Bergersen (1960–1990), Swedish musician and songwriter
- Per Bergerud (born 1956), Norwegian ski jumper
- Per Bergman (1886–1950), Swedish competitive sailor
- Per Bergsland (1918–1992), Norwegian pilot, prisoner of war, and escapee from Stalag Luft III
- Per Bertilsson (1892–1972), Swedish gymnast
- Per Bill (born 1958), Swedish politician
- Per Bjerregaard (born 1946), executive director of Danish football club Brøndby IF
- Per Bjørang (born 1948), Norwegian speed skater
- Per Blom (canoeist) (born 1949), Norwegian sprint canoer
- Per Blom (director) (1946–2013), Norwegian film director
- Per Borten (1913–2005), Prime Minister of Norway, 1965–1971
- Per Brahe the Elder (1520–1590), Swedish statesman
- Per Brahe the Younger (1602–1680), Swedish soldier and statesman
- Per Brandtzæg (1936–2016), Norwegian physician and professor
- Per Bratland (1907–1988), Norwegian newspaper editor and author
- Per Bredesen (1930–2022), Norwegian footballer
- Per Brinch Hansen (1938–2007), Danish-American computer scientist and pioneer of concurrent programming
- Per Brogeland (born 1953), Norwegian football coach
- Per Bronken (1935–2002), Norwegian poet, novelist, actor, and stage producer
- Per Brunvand (1937–2015), Norwegian newspaper editor
- Per Buckhøj (1902–1964), Danish film actor
- Per Bäckman (born 1950), Swedish ice hockey player

== C–J ==
- Per Carlén (born 1960), Swedish handball player
- Per Carleson (1917–2004), Swedish officer and fencer
- Per Carlqvist (born 1938), Swedish plasma physicist
- Per Carlsen (diplomat) (1948–2020), Swedish diplomat
- Per Carlsén (born 1960), Swedish curler
- Per Cederblom (1901–1987), Swedish breaststroke swimmer
- Per Christensen (1934–2009), Norwegian actor
- Per Eberhard Cogell (1734–1812), Swedish artist
- Per Collinder (1890–1974), Swedish astronomer
- Per Dalin (1936–2010), Norwegian educationalist
- Per Ditlev-Simonsen (born 1932), Norwegian politician and former mayor of Oslo
- Per Drageset (1944–2022), Norwegian civil servant
- Per Eggers (born 1951), Swedish actor
- Per Egil Flo (born 1989), Norwegian footballer
- Per Arne Glorvigen (born 1963), Norwegian musician and composer
- Per Erik Granström (1942–2011), Swedish politician
- Per Egil Hegge (1940–2023), Norwegian journalist
- Per Einarsson (born 1984), Swedish bandy player
- Per Enflo (born 1944), Swedish mathematician and concert pianist
- Per Egil Evensen (born 1950), Norwegian politician
- Per Gedda (1914–2005), Swedish sailor
- Per Gessle (born 1959), Swedish musician, member of Roxette
- Per Günther (born 1988), German basketball player
- Per Häggström (1971–1996), Swedish murder victim
- Per Strand Hagenes (born 2003), Norwegian cyclist
- Per-Arne Håkansson (born 1963), Swedish politician
- Per Albin Hansson (1885–1946), Swedish politician
- Per Holst (1939–2025), Danish film producer and director
- Per Husted (born 1966), Danish politician

== K–Z ==
- Per Kellin (1903–1973), Swedish Army major general
- Per Kirkeby (1938–2018), Danish artist
- Per Krøldrup (born 1979), retired Danish footballer
- Per Lind (1916–2012), Swedish diplomat
- Per Martin-Löf (born 1942), Swedish logician, philosopher, and mathematical statistician
- Per Botolf Maurseth (born 1969), Norwegian economist and politician
- Per Mertesacker (born 1984), retired German footballer
- Per Mohn (born 1945), Norwegian politician
- Per Edmund Mordt (born 1965), retired Norwegian footballer
- Per Nørgård (1932–2025), Danish composer and music theorist
- Per Yngve Ohlin (1969–1991), Swedish singer, better known as Dead
- Per T. Ohlsson (1958–2022), Swedish journalist
- Per Skjærvik (born 1953), Norwegian politician
- Erik Per Sullivan (born 1991), American-Swedish actor
- Per Welinder (born 1962), Swedish professional skateboarder

== See also ==
- Pär
- Pehr
- Peter
