= Peh (disambiguation) =

Peh is an Indian village in Manipur.

Peh may also refer to:

== Language ==
- Pe (Semitic letter), 17th letter of the Arabic, Hebrew and Syriac writing systems
  - Pe (Persian letter), 3rd letter of that abjad

== People ==
=== People in government and politics ===
- Peh Chin Hua (born 1947), Singaporean politician
- Simon Peh (born 1955), Hong Kong government official
- Ting Chew Peh (born 1943), Malaysian politician

=== Other people ===
- Pierre-Emile Højbjerg ("PEH", born 1995), Danish association football player
- Joanne Peh (born 1983), Singaporean actress and television host
- Vanessa Peh (born 1994), Singaporean actress, model and entrepreneur
- Peh Thian Hui, Singaporean child rapist

== Other uses ==
- Phenylethylidenehydrazine, an antidepressant metabolite
- Poisoned Electrick Head, an English psychedelic rock band

== See also ==
- Pehr, a Swedish given name
- Péhé, a town in Ivory Coast
