= Petterd =

Petterd is a surname. Notable people with the surname include:

- Ricky Petterd (born 1988), Australian rules footballer
- William Frederick Petterd (1849–1910), Tasmanian scientist and boot importer

== See also ==
- Petter (given name)
