= List of international prime ministerial trips made by Abiy Ahmed =

Visits by Prime Minister Abiy Ahmed since 2018

This is a list of international prime ministerial trips made by Abiy Ahmed, the 4th Prime Minister of Ethiopia, since taking office on 2 April 2018.

== 2018 ==
Country	Areas visited	Date(s)	Notes
Djibouti	Djibouti City	28–29 April	Official visit to Djibouti.
Sudan	Khartoum	2–3 May	Official visit to Sudan.
Kenya	Nairobi	6–7 May	Official visit. Bilateral and regional issues were top of the agenda.
Saudi Arabia	Riyadh	17–18 May	Official visit to Saudi Arabia.
United Arab Emirates	Abu Dhabi	18 May	Working visit.
Egypt	Cairo	9–10 June	Official visit. Met with President Abdel Fattah el-Sisi.
Eritrea	Asmara	8–9 July	Official visit. Attended the 2018 Eritrea–Ethiopia summit and met with President Isaias Afwerki.
United States	Washington, D.C., Minneapolis, Los Angeles	26 July – 1 August	Official visit to the United States.
China	Beijing	3–4 September	Working visit. Attended the 2018 Forum on China–Africa Cooperation summit.
Eritrea	Asmara	5 September	Working visit.
Saudi Arabia	Jeddah	15 September	Working visit. Attended the signing of the Ethiopia–Eritrea peace agreement.
France	Paris	29 October	Official visit. Signed a joint declaration on a special partnership between France and Ethiopia with President Emmanuel Macron.
Germany	Berlin	30–31 October	Official visit.

== 2019 ==
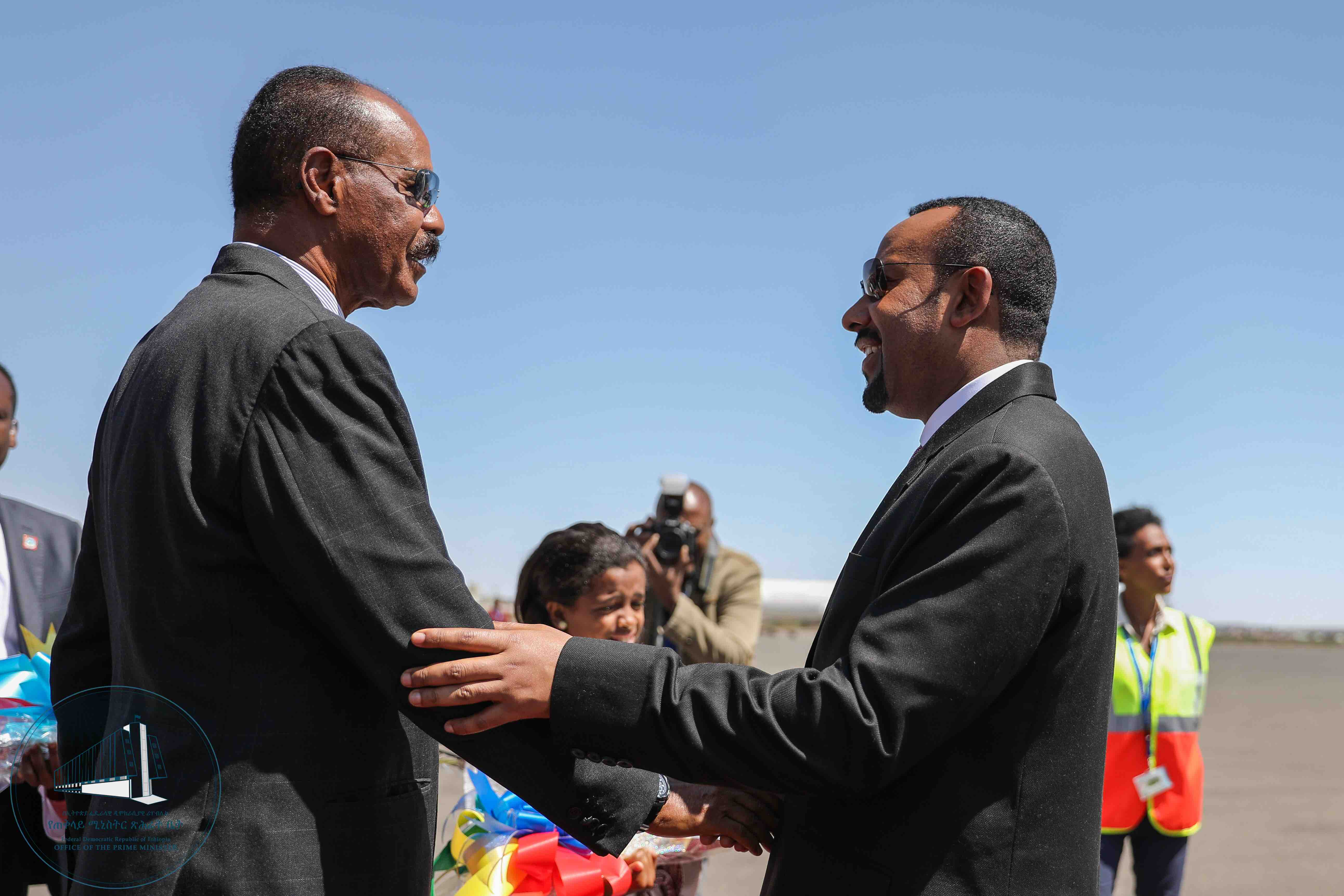
Abiy and Isaias meeting each other in March 2019

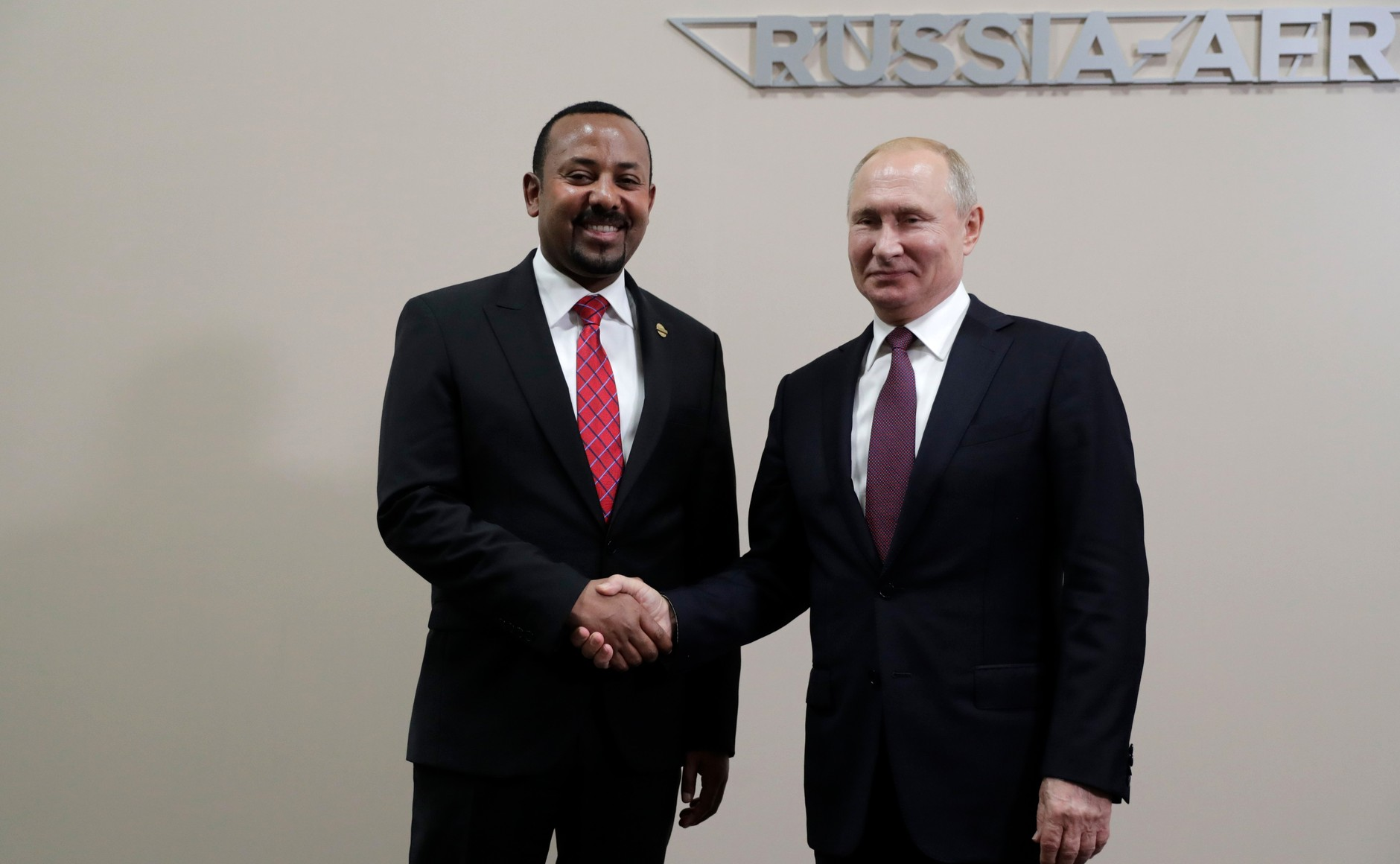
Abiy and Russian President Vladimir Putin at the Russia–Africa Summit on 23 October 2019

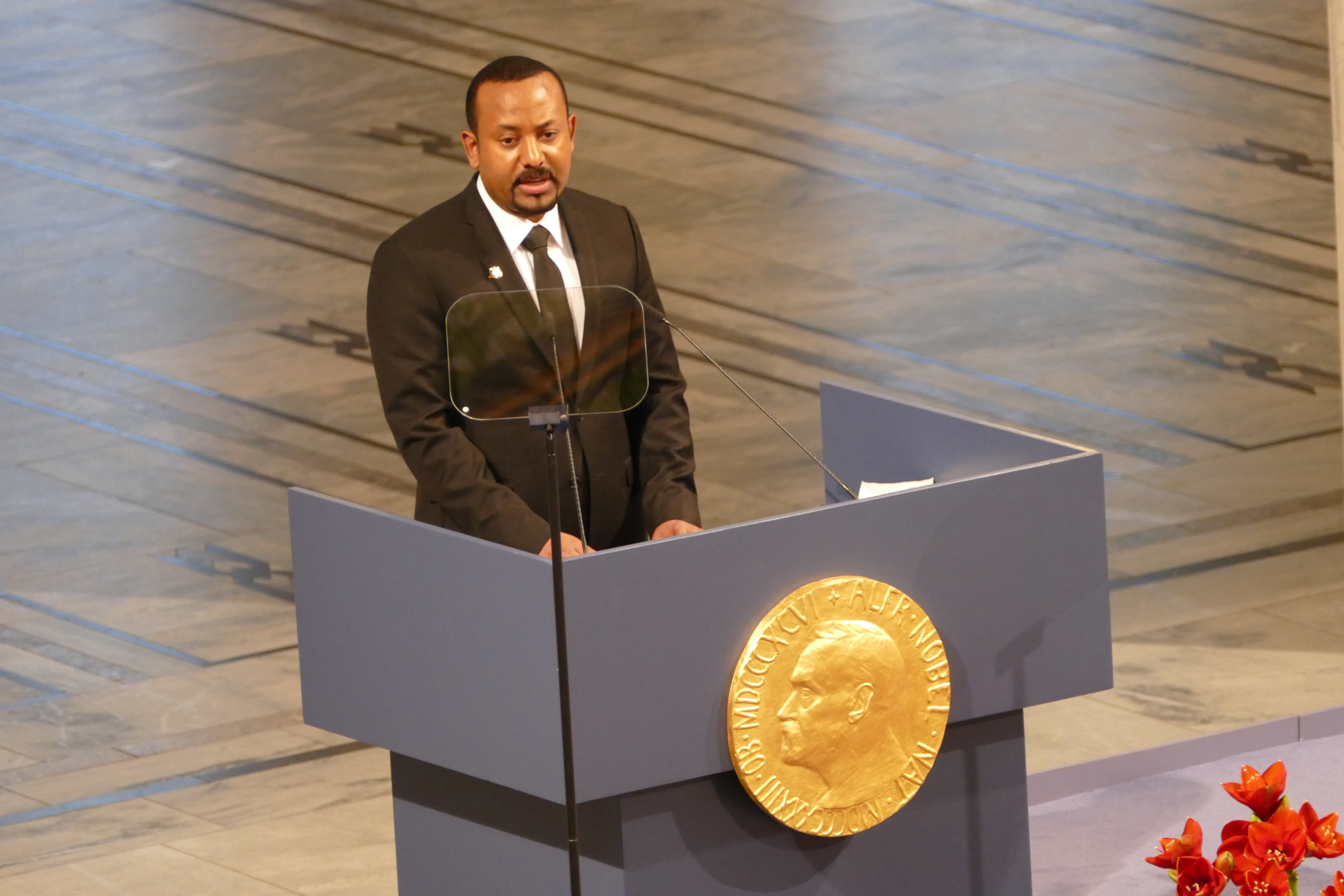
Abiy delivering his acceptance speech after receiving the 2019 Nobel Peace Prize in December 2019

Country	Areas visited	Date(s)	Notes
Italy	Rome	20–21 January	Official visit.
Vatican City	Vatican City	21 January	Official visit. Met with Pope Francis.
Belgium	Brussels	22–25 January	Official visit.
Switzerland	Davos	22–25 January	Working visit. Attended the World Economic Forum annual meeting.
Eritrea	Asmara	3 March	Working visit. Attended a mini-summit with President Isaias Afwerki and President Uhuru Kenyatta.
Qatar	Doha	20 March	Working visit. Met with Prime Minister Abdullah bin Nasser bin Khalifa Al Thani.
United Arab Emirates	Abu Dhabi	20 March	Working visit.
Rwanda	Kigali	6 April	Working visit. Attended the 25th commemoration of the Rwandan genocide.
Sudan	Khartoum	7 June	Working visit.
Eritrea	Asmara	18–19 July	Working visit.
South Korea	Seoul	25–27 August	Official visit.
Japan	Yokohama, Tokyo	27–30 August	Official visit. Attended the Tokyo International Conference on African Development (TICAD 7).
Russia	Sochi	22–24 October	Working visit. Attended the 2019 Russia–Africa Summit and met with President Vladimir Putin.
Germany	Berlin	19–20 November	Official visit. Met with Chancellor Angela Merkel.
Sweden	Stockholm	9 December	Working visit. Met with Prime Minister Stefan Löfven.
Norway	Oslo	9–11 December	Official visit. Received the Nobel Peace Prize.

== 2020 ==
Country	Areas visited	Date(s)	Notes
South Africa	Pretoria	11–12 January	Official visit. Met with President Cyril Ramaphosa.
United Arab Emirates	Abu Dhabi	13–15 February	Working visit.
Eritrea	Asmara	18–19 July	Working visit.
Sudan	Khartoum	25 August	Working visit.
Djibouti	Djibouti City	20 December	Working visit. Attended the 38th extraordinary summit of the Intergovernmental Authority on Development (IGAD).

== 2021 ==
Country	Areas visited	Date(s)	Notes
Eritrea	Asmara	25–26 March	Working visit. Eritrea agreed to withdraw its forces from Tigray.
Turkey	Ankara	18 August	Official visit.
Uganda	Kampala	29 August	Working visit. Met with President Yoweri Museveni.
Ghana	Accra	8 September	Working visit. Held bilateral discussions with President Nana Akufo-Addo.

== 2022 ==
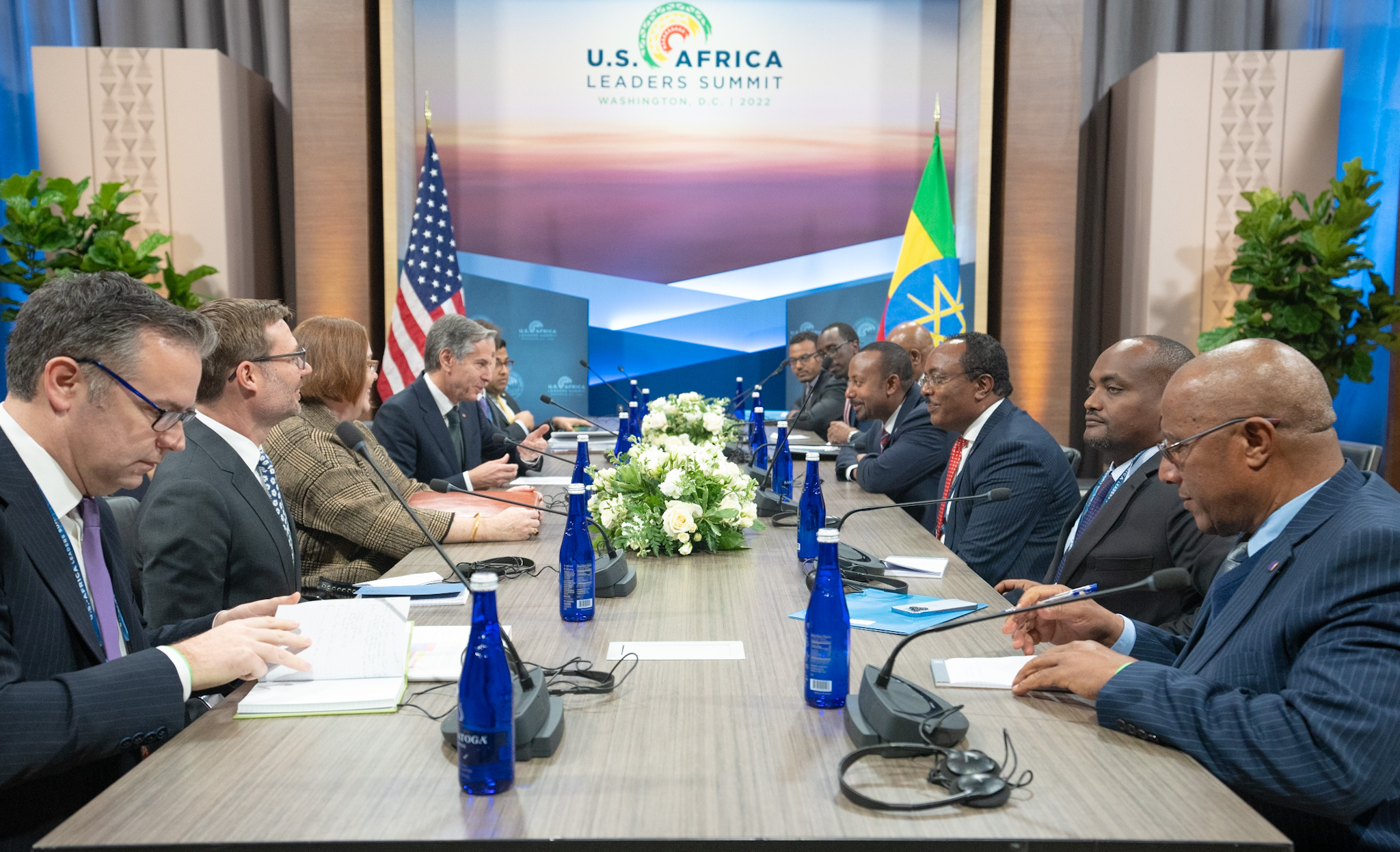
Abiy meeting with U.S. Secretary of State Antony Blinken at the United States–Africa Leaders Summit 2022

Country	Areas visited	Date(s)	Notes
United Arab Emirates	Abu Dhabi	29 January	Working visit.
Nigeria	Abuja	25–26 May	Working visit.
Equatorial Guinea	Malabo	26–28 May	Working visit. Attended the African Union extraordinary summit.
Kenya	Nairobi	28 May	Working visit. Made an appearance with President Uhuru Kenyatta at the Museum Airshow Festival.
Somalia	Mogadishu	9 June	Working visit. Attended the inauguration of President Hassan Sheikh Mohamud.
Djibouti	Djibouti City	10 June	Working visit.
Kenya	Nairobi	5 July	Working visit. Met with Sudanese leader Abdel Fattah al-Burhan in Nairobi.
Djibouti	Djibouti City	14 September	Official visit.
United States	Washington, D.C.	13–15 December	Working visit. Attended the United States–Africa Leaders Summit 2022.

== 2023 ==
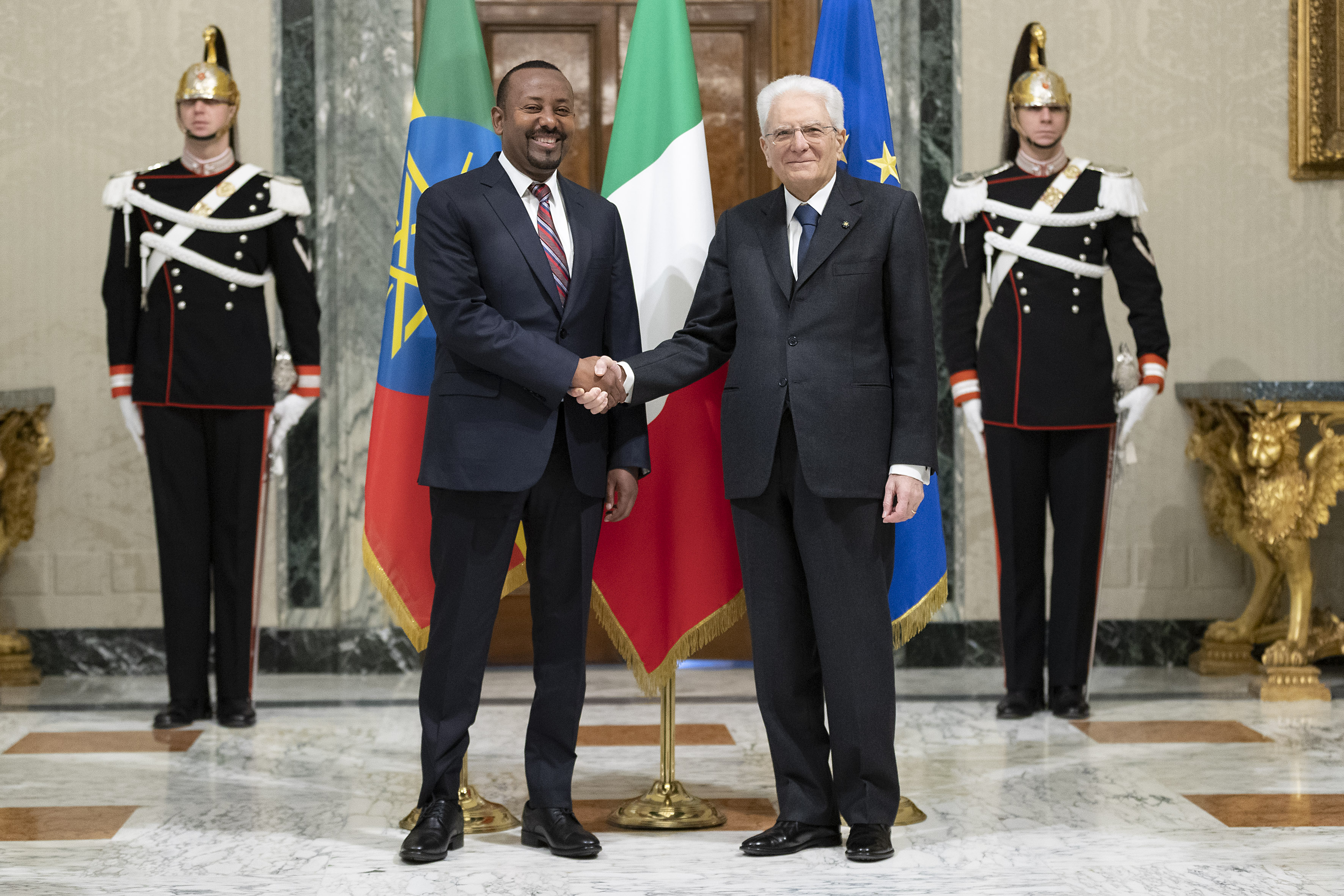
Abiy meeting with Italian President Sergio Mattarella in February 2023

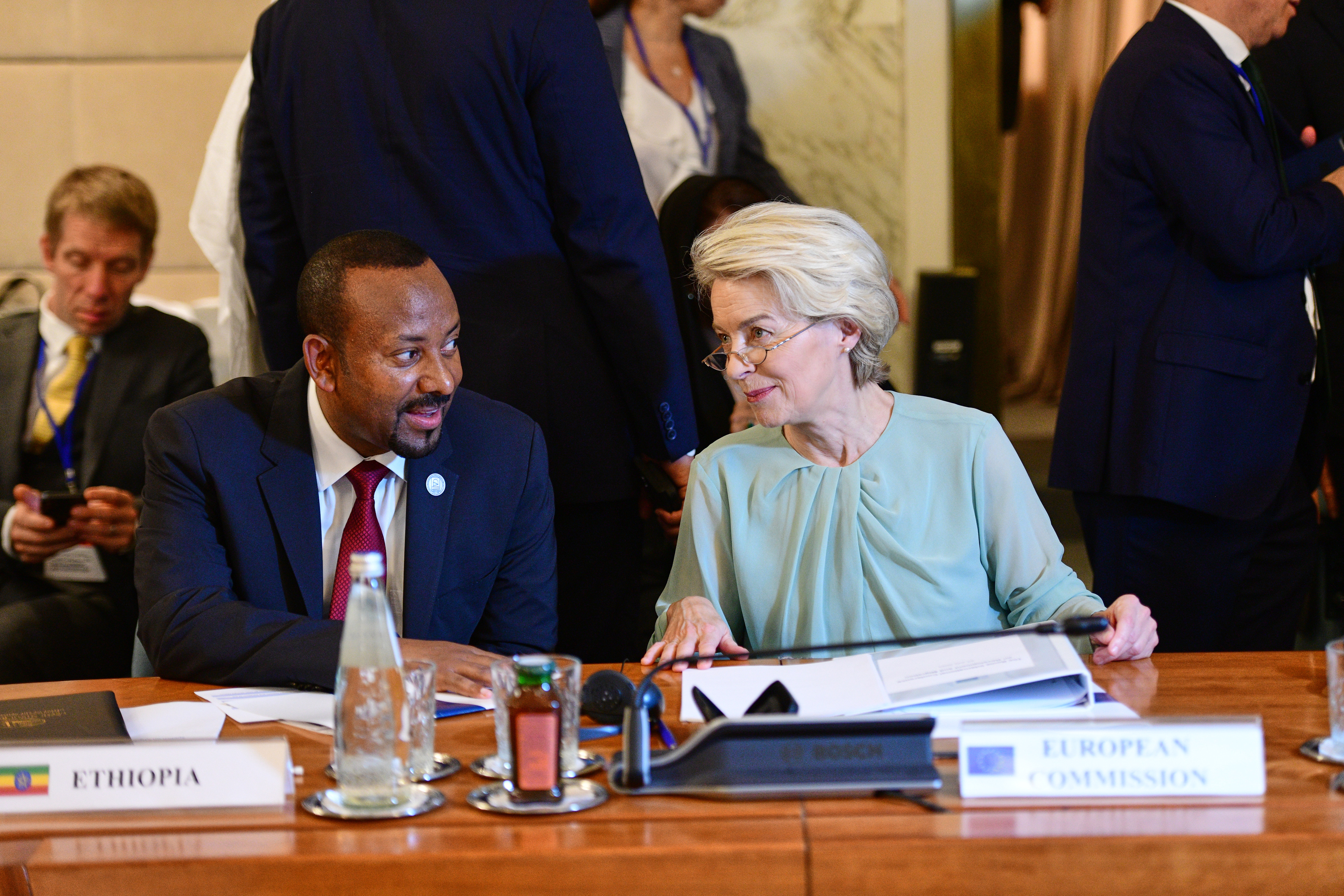
Abiy meeting with European Commission President Ursula von der Leyen in July 2023

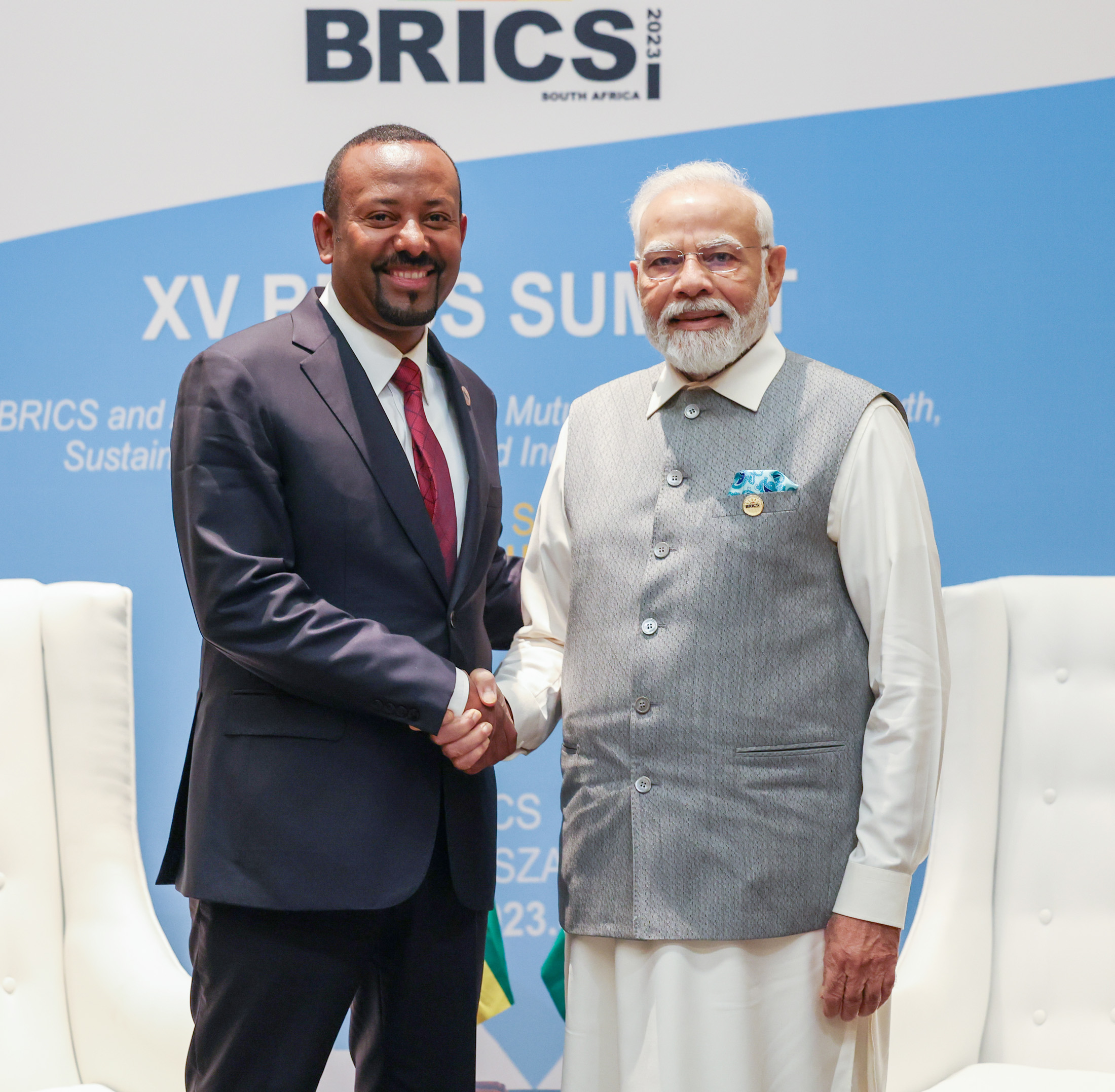
Abiy meeting with Indian Prime Minister Narendra Modi for Ethiopia's admission to the BRICS alliance he attended in August 2023

Country	Areas visited	Date(s)	Notes
Sudan	Khartoum	26 January	Working visit.
Italy	Rome	23–25 July	Working visit. Attended the UN Food Systems Summit and the International Conference on Development and Migration.
France	Paris	7–8 February	Official visit. Met with President Emmanuel Macron.
South Sudan	Juba	14 March	Working visit. Met with President Salva Kiir.
France	Paris	22–23 June	Working visit. Attended the Summit for a New Global Financing Pact.
Egypt	Cairo	12–13 July	Official visit. Met with President Abdel Fattah el-Sisi and discussed the Grand Ethiopian Renaissance Dam (GERD) and bilateral ties.
Italy	Rome	23–25 July	Working visit. Attended the UN Food Systems Summit and the International Development and Migration Conference. Unveiled a plaque for Olympic marathon champion Abebe Bikila.
Russia	Saint Petersburg	26 July	Working visit. Attended the 2023 Russia–Africa Summit.
South Africa	Johannesburg	24 August	Working visit. Attended the 15th BRICS summit.
China	Beijing	17–20 October	Official visit. Attended the Belt and Road Forum for International Cooperation and met with President Xi Jinping.
Austria	Vienna	26–27 November	Official visit.
Czech Republic	Prague	27–28 November	Official visit. Received a ceremonial welcome from Prime Minister Petr Fiala.

== 2024 ==
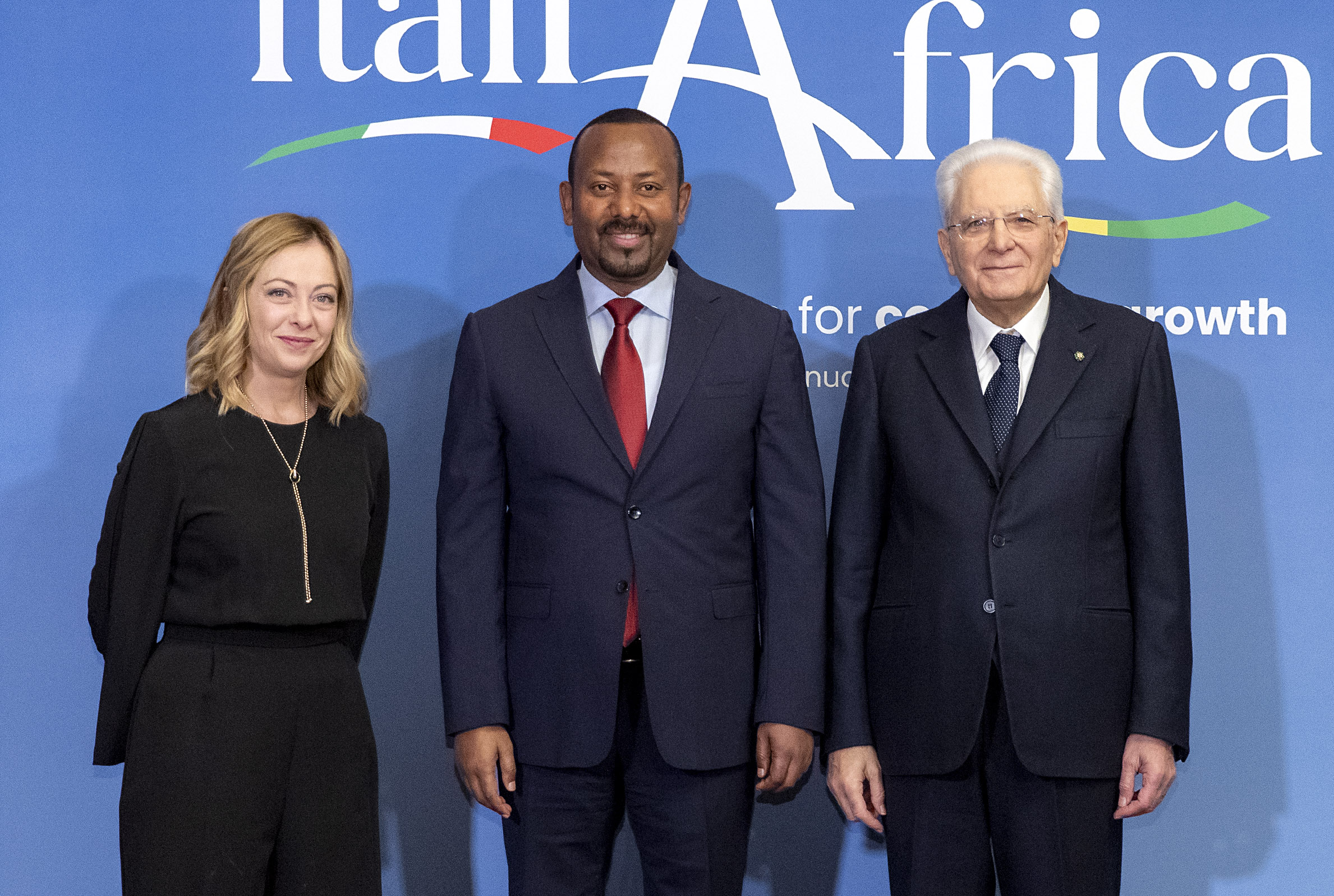
Abiy attending the 2024 Italy–Africa Summit with Italian Prime Minister Giorgia Meloni and President Sergio Mattarella

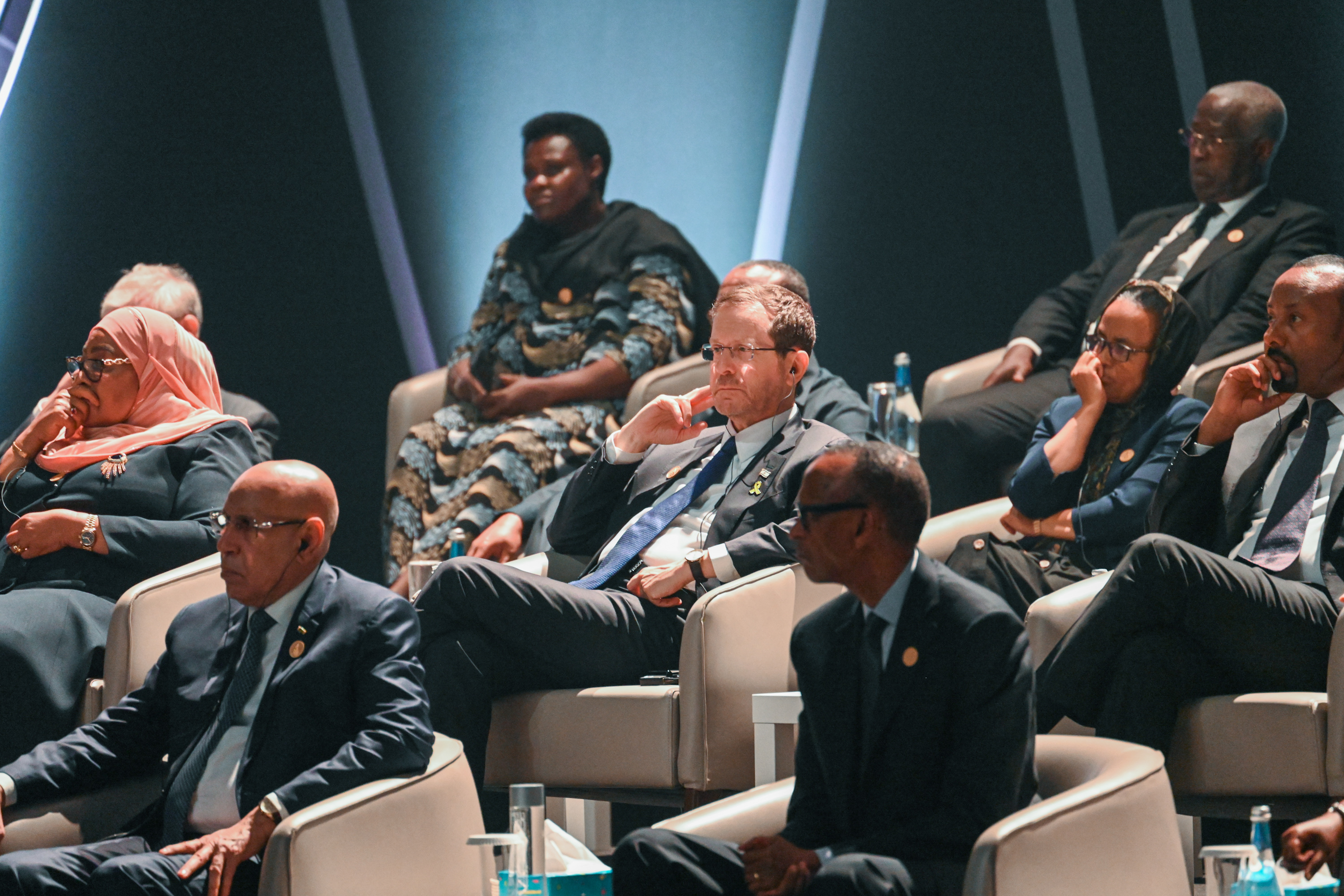
Abiy with Rwandan President Paul Kagame and Israeli President Isaac Herzog at the Kigali Genocide Memorial in Rwanda, 7 April 2024

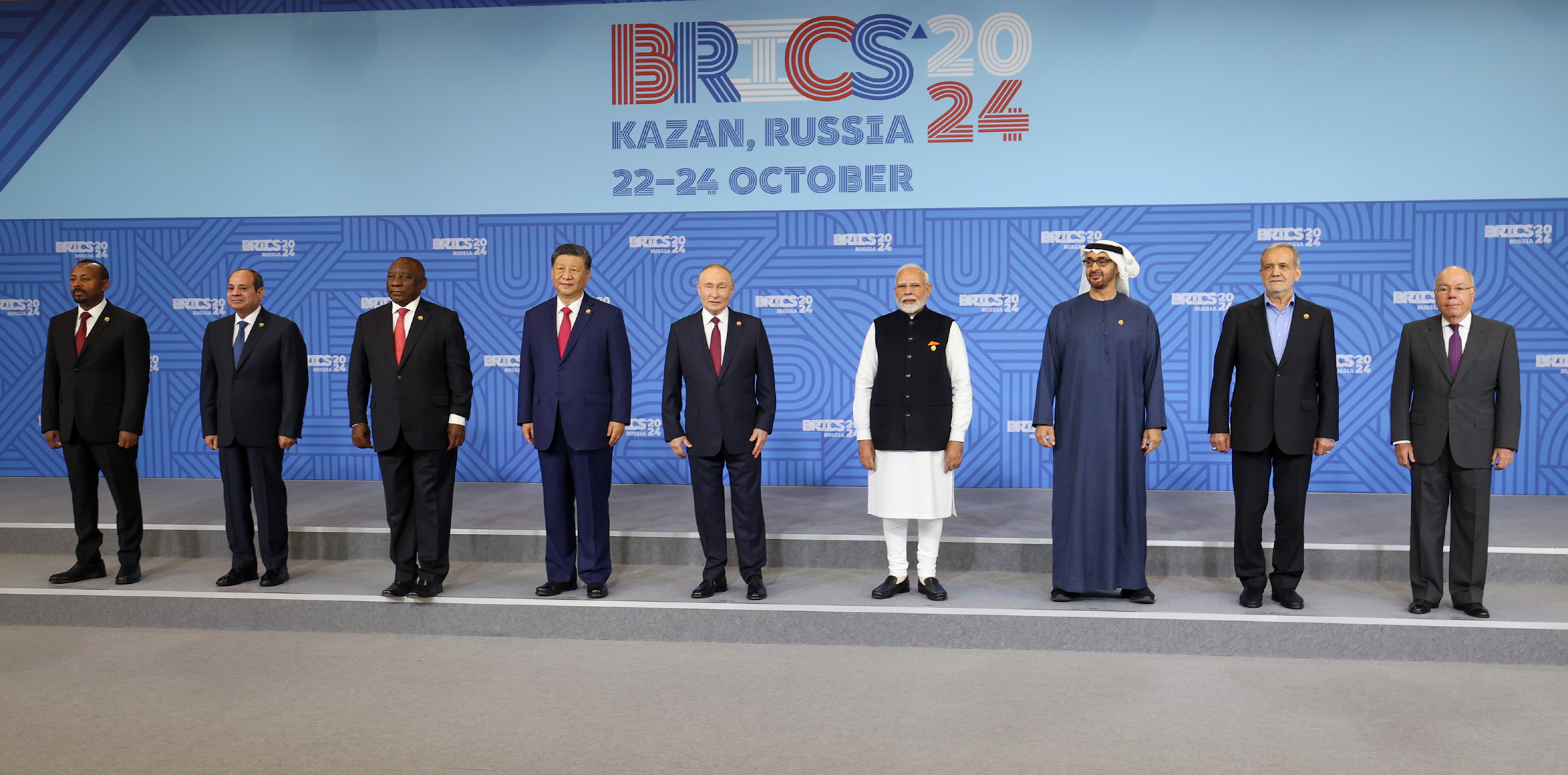
Abiy attending the 16th BRICS summit

Country	Areas visited	Date(s)	Notes
Italy	Rome	28–29 January	Working visit. Attended the 2024 Italy–Africa Summit.
Kenya	Nairobi	27–28 February	Official visit.
Tanzania	Dodoma, Dar es Salaam	29 February – 2 March	Official visit.
Rwanda	Kigali	6–7 April	Working visit. Attended the 30th commemoration of the Rwandan genocide (Kwibuka 30).
South Korea	Seoul	2–4 June	Working visit. Attended the 2024 South Korea–Africa Summit.
Singapore	Singapore	4–6 June	Official visit.
Sudan	Port Sudan	9 July	Working visit. Visited Sudanese army chief Abdel Fattah al-Burhan on the Red Sea coast.
China	Beijing	4–6 September	Working visit. Attended the 2024 Forum on China–Africa Cooperation summit.
Russia	Kazan	22–24 October	Working visit. Attended the 16th BRICS summit and met with President Vladimir Putin.
Malaysia	Kuala Lumpur	25–26 October	Official visit.

== 2025 ==
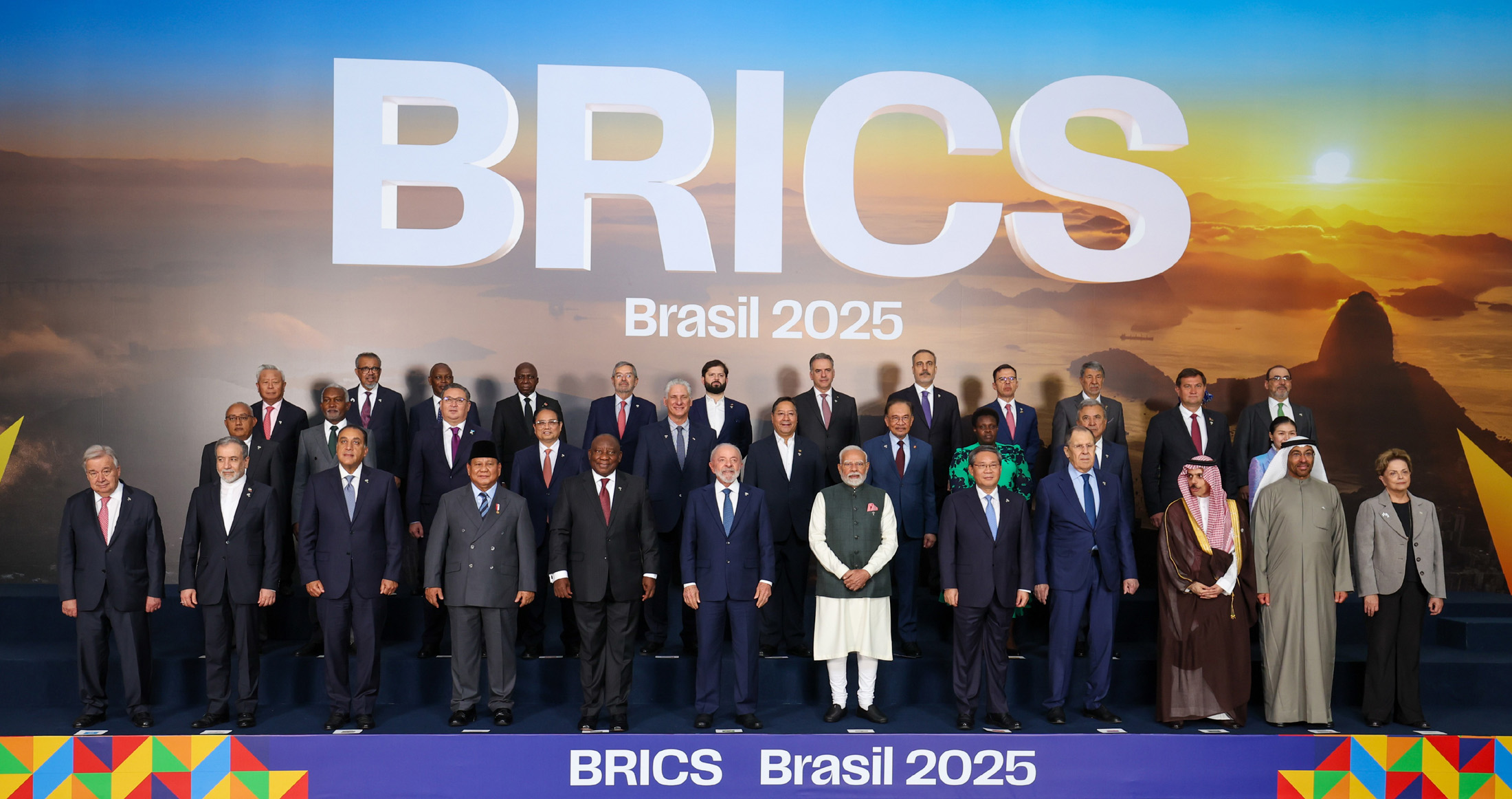
Abiy attending the 17th BRICS summit

Country	Areas visited	Date(s)	Notes
France	Paris	21–22 May	Official visit. Met with President Emmanuel Macron.
Italy	Rome	25–26 May	Official visit. Met with Prime Minister Giorgia Meloni.
Brazil	Rio de Janeiro	6–7 July	Attended the 17th BRICS summit. Met with President Luiz Inácio Lula da Silva ahead of the summit.
South Africa	Johannesburg	21–23 November	Working visit. Attended the pre-G20 African leaders' meeting.

== 2026 ==
Abiy attending the 18th BRICS summit

Country	Areas visited	Date(s)	Notes
Azerbaijan	Baku	26–28 February	Official visit.
United Arab Emirates	Abu Dhabi	12 March	Working visit.
Djibouti	Djibouti City	9 May	Working visit. Attended the presidential inauguration of President Ismaïl Omar Guelleh.
Kenya	Nairobi	12 May	Working visit. Attended the Africa Forward Summit.
India	New Delhi	11–13 September	Working visit. Attended the 18th BRICS summit.
Kenya	Nairobi	20–22 October	Working visit. Met with President William Ruto.
Russia	Moscow	28–29 October	Official visit. Attended the third Russia–Africa Summit, where he delivered an address highlighting food security, energy and skills transfer, and cooperation on a nuclear power plant. Held talks with President Vladimir Putin at the Kremlin on the sidelines.
Turkey	Antalya	10–11 November	Working visit. Attended the COP31 Leaders' Summit and held bilateral talks with President Recep Tayyip Erdoğan on the sidelines.

== See also ==
- Foreign relations of Ethiopia
