= 2019 Nobel Peace Prize =

- Abiy Ahmed
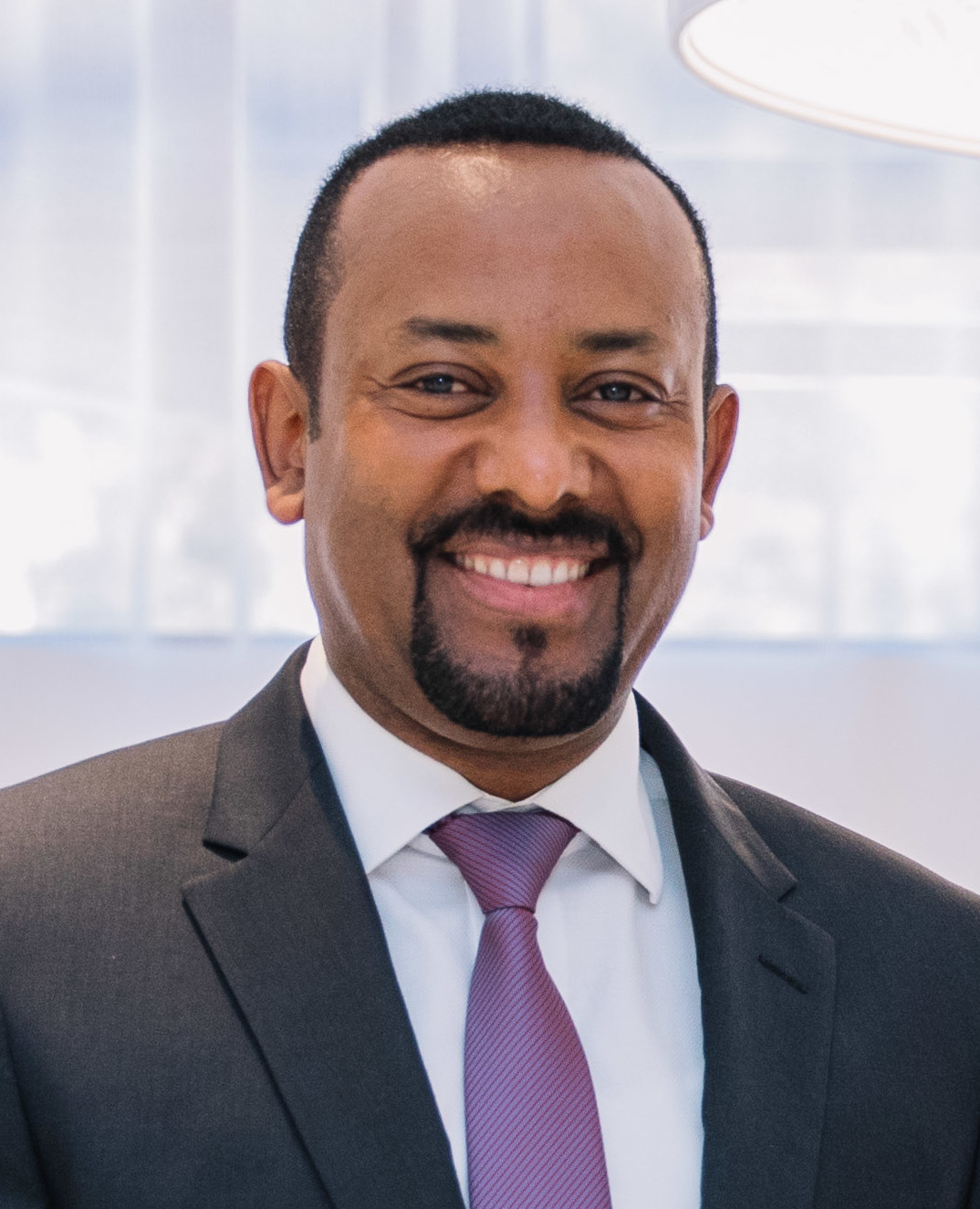
- "for his efforts to achieve peace and international cooperation, and in particular for his decisive initiative to resolve the border conflict with neighbouring Eritrea."
- Date: 11 October 2019 (announcement by Berit Reiss-Andersen); 10 December 2019 (ceremony)
- Location: Oslo, Norway
- Presented by: Norwegian Nobel Committee
- Reward: 9.0 million SEK (815 680 €)
- First award: 1901
- Website: Official website

The 2019 Nobel Peace Prize was awarded to the prime minister of Ethiopia Abiy Ahmed (born 1976) "for his efforts to achieve peace and international cooperation, and in particular for his decisive initiative to resolve the border conflict with neighbouring Eritrea." The award was announced by the Norwegian Nobel Committee on 11 October 2019.

One year after Abiy received the prize, he presided over the outbreak of the Tigray War, which saw hundreds of thousands of casualties and led to the displacement of more than 800,000 persons. In response to the outbreak of hostilities, the Norwegian Nobel Committee released a statement in January 2022 which called the humanitarian situation "extremely serious"; said the lack of delivery of humanitarian aid to Tigray was "unacceptable"; and observed that "As Prime Minister and a winner of the Nobel Peace Prize, Abiy Ahmed has a special responsibility to end the conflict and help to create peace."

Since Abiy was awarded the prize, his leadership during Tigray War has been characterized by media organizations such as The Guardian, Der Spiegel, NPR, and CNN as genocidal. He has been frequently named as the least deserving winner of the Nobel Prize. In 2026, hostilities between Ethiopia and Eritrea began once again.

== Candidates ==
Nominations confirmed by the various News Agencies
Image	Nominee	Country	Motivations	Nominator(s)	Source
	Donald Trump (born 1946)	United States	"for his efforts to make peace with North Korea and handling its nuclear program."	Luke Messer, member of the American Republican Party	
	Zoran Zaev (born 1974)	North Macedonia	"for their efforts to end a 27-year dispute through a historic agreement between their countries."	members of the Tunisian National Dialogue Quartet; 3 members of the European Parliament	
	Alexis Tsipras (born 1974)	Greece	"for their efforts to end a 27-year dispute through a historic agreement between their countries."	members of the Tunisian National Dialogue Quartet; 3 members of the European Parliament	
	Greta Thunberg (born 2003)	Sweden	"for her influential activism to make world leaders open their eyes to global climate crisis."	Freddy André Øvstegård, Mona Fagerås, and Lars Haltbrekken, members of the Norwegian Socialist Left Party	
	Ilwad Elman (born 1989)	Somalia; Canada	"for her work with the Elman Peace and Human Rights Center in Somalia."		
	Jacinda Ardern (born 1980)	New Zealand	"for her quick response to tackle the situation after the Christchurch terror attack."		
	José Andrés (born 1969)	Spain; United States	"for his work on food and hunger humanitarianism, and his disaster relief efforts with World Central Kitchen."	John Delaney, member of the American Democratic Party	
	Abiy Ahmed (born 1976)	Ethiopia	"for establishing a peace treaty to end the Eritrean–Ethiopian War."		
	Raoni Metuktire (born 1932)	Brazil	"for his lifelong efforts to protect nature and the rights of indigenous people in the Amazon."	Darcy Ribeiro Foundation	
	Bill Richardson (born 1947)	United States	"for decades of work on behalf of hostages and prisoners held in several nations, including North Korea."	Tom Udall, member of American Democratic Party	
	Ilham Tohti (born 1969)	China	"for his commitment to peaceful interethnic dialogue between Uyghurs and China's Han majority."	members of the U.S. House of Representatives	
	Mark Kline	United States	"for his work with the Baylor International Pediatric AIDS Initiative, the world’s largest provider of HIV/AIDS care and treatment."	Texas Children's Hospital	
	Reporters Without Borders (founded in 1985)	France	"for promoting media freedom and protecting journalists around the world."		
	Foro Penal (founded in 2005)	Venezuela	"for their work fighting injustice and being guarantors of freedom for each of the political prisoners arbitrarily detained during the regime of Nicolás Maduro."		
	Huichol Center for Cultural Survival and the Traditional Arts (founded in 1977)	Mexico	" for the lifelong commitment of the center to peacefully preserve a culture and the spiritual connection the Huichol people have with the land."	Drugs Peace Institute	
	Elena Milashina (born 1977)	Russia		Petter Eide	
	Svetlana Gannushkina (born 1942)	Russia		Petter Eide	
	Olga Alexandrovna Sadovskaya (born 1980)	Russia		Petter Eide	

== Nobel Committee ==
Tasked with reviewing nominations from September of the previous year through February 1 and ultimately selecting the Prize winners, the members of the Norwegian Nobel Committee for 2019 were:

- Berit Reiss-Andersen (chair, born 1954), advocate (barrister) and president of the Norwegian Bar Association, former state secretary for the Minister of Justice and the Police (representing the Labour Party). Member of the Norwegian Nobel Committee since 2012, reappointed for the period 2018–2023.
- Henrik Syse (vice-chair, born 1966), research professor at the Peace Research Institute Oslo. Member of the Committee since 2015, appointed for the period 2015–2020.
- Thorbjørn Jagland (born 1950), former Member of Parliament and President of the Storting and former Prime Minister for the Labour Party, current Secretary-General of the Council of Europe. Chair of the Norwegian Nobel Committee from 2009 to 2015. Currently regular member. Member of the Committee since 2009, reappointed for the period 2015–2020.
- Anne Enger (born 1949), former Leader of the Centre Party and Minister of Culture. Appointed for the period 2018–2020.
- Asle Toje (born 1974), foreign policy scholar. Appointed for the period 2018–2023.

== See also ==
- Nobel Peace Prize controversies
