= Philippe-Auguste Hennequin =

French painter (1762–1833)

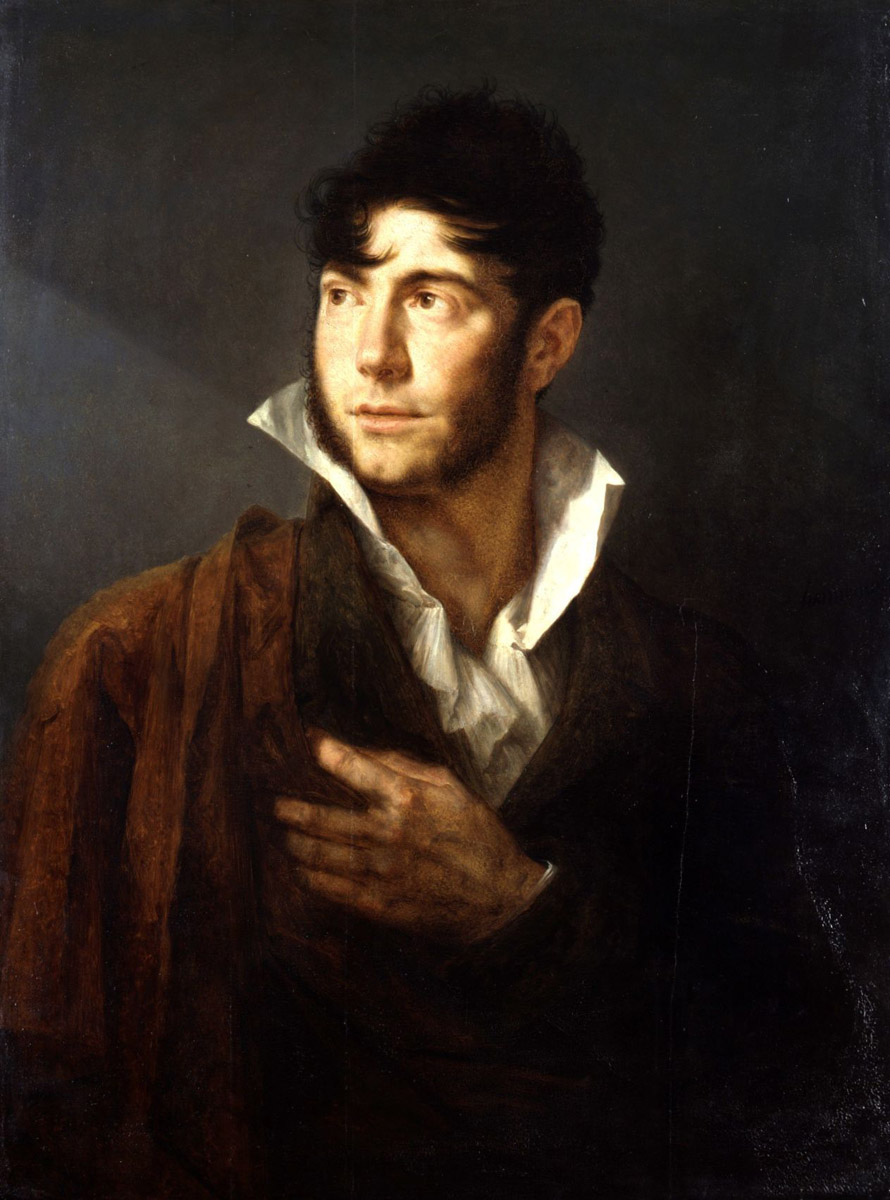
1812 self-portrait of Hennequin

Philippe-Auguste Hennequin (10 August 1762 – 12 May 1833) was a French painter who specialised in history painting and portrait painting.

== Biography ==
A student of the Swede Per Eberhard Cogell (1734–1812) in Lyon, then in Paris a student of David, he then went to Rome thanks to an English patron, but was forced to leave the city due to the anti-French riots of 1793. Under the First French Empire he produced large historical compositions, such as Napoleon Distributing the Legion of Honour at the Camp of Boulogne (1806), A Battle of the Pyramids (1806) and the 4m by 6m The Triumph of the French people on 10 August (1799, won the first prize at the Paris Salon that year but was cut up and split between the museums of Rouen, Angers, Le Mans and Caen in 1820). Under the Bourbon Restoration, he went into self-imposed exile in Belgium, where he was director of the Académie de Tournai, though he later died in poverty. Many of his drawings are held at the Musée des Beaux-Arts de Lyon.

== Gallery ==
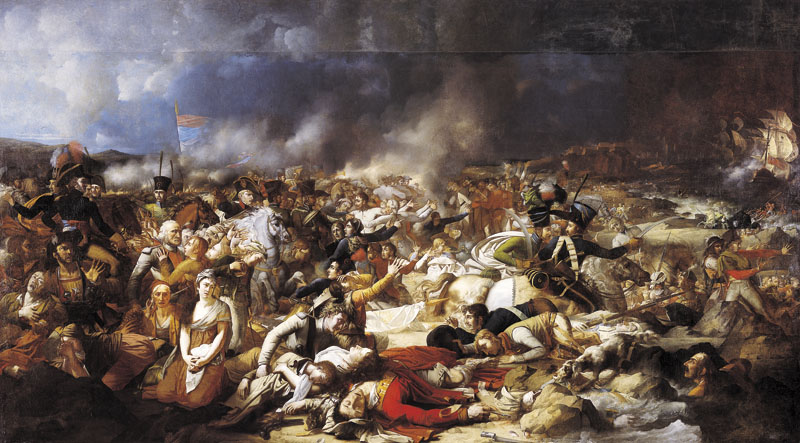
The Battle of Quiberon, 1804

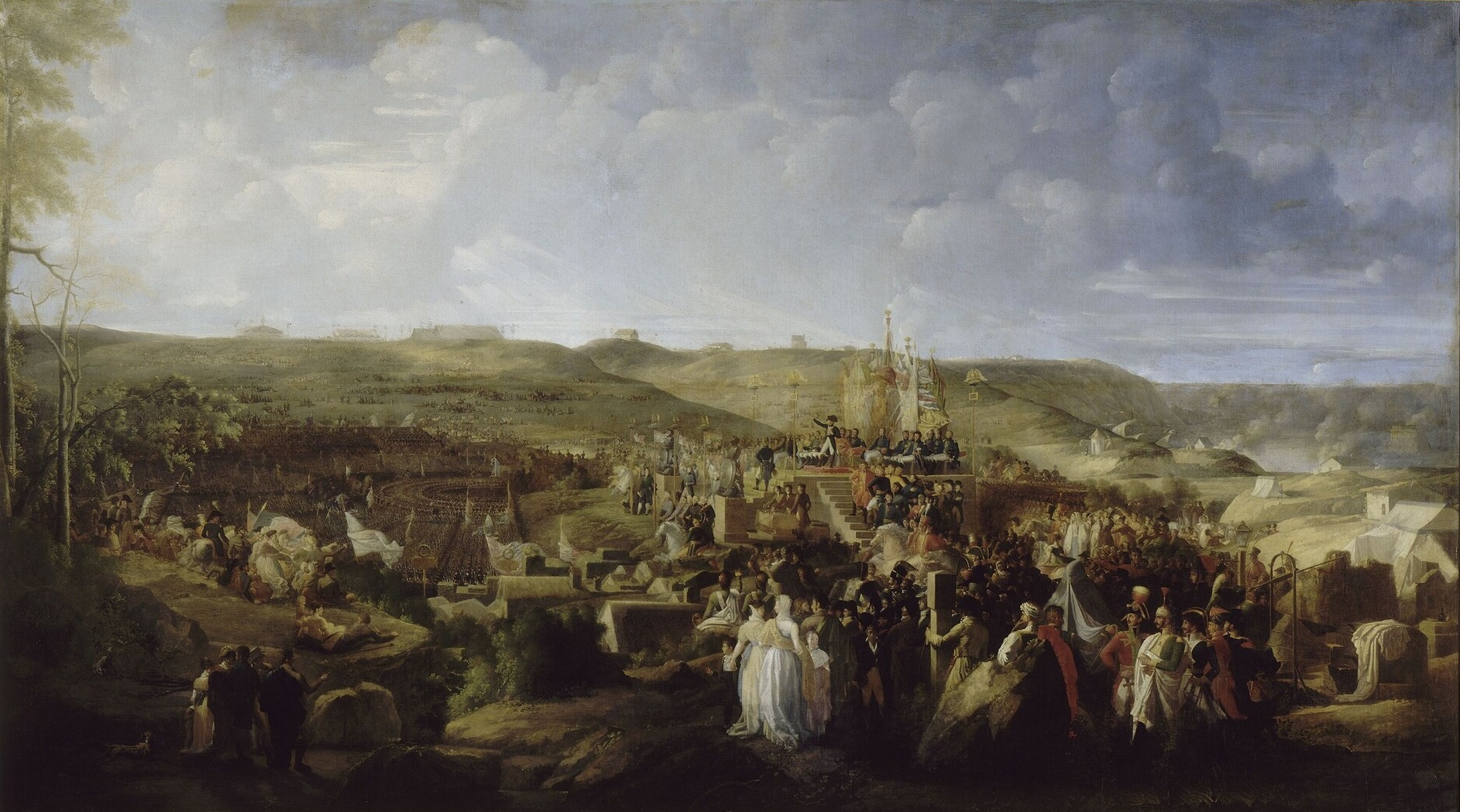
Napoleon Distributing the Legion of Honour at the Camp of Boulogne, 1806
