= Petter Sevel =

Norwegian footballer (the shame walker)

Personal information
- Date of birth: 9 December 1974 (age 51)
- Height: 1.90 m (6 ft 3 in)
- Position: Midfielder

Youth career
- Kleppestø

Senior career*
Years	Team	Apps	(Gls)
1992–1998	Kleppestø		
1999–2000	Haugesund	20	(1)
2001	Stord		
2007	Askøy		
2008–2010	Vestsiden Askøy		
- * Club domestic league appearances and goals

Petter Sevel (born 9 December 1974) is a retired Norwegian football midfielder.

His family moved from Loddefjord to Horsøy in the mid-1980s. As a teenager he was a part of the Norwegian junior national team in boxing. He played for Kleppestø before being discovered by Haugesund ahead of the 1999 season. He helped win promotion and played in the 2000 Eliteserien, but was not a regular and went on to Stord.

In 2007 he made a comeback in Kleppestø, which had now been merged to form the club Askøy, before playing for smaller local club Vestsiden Askøy.
