= Björn Rosenström =

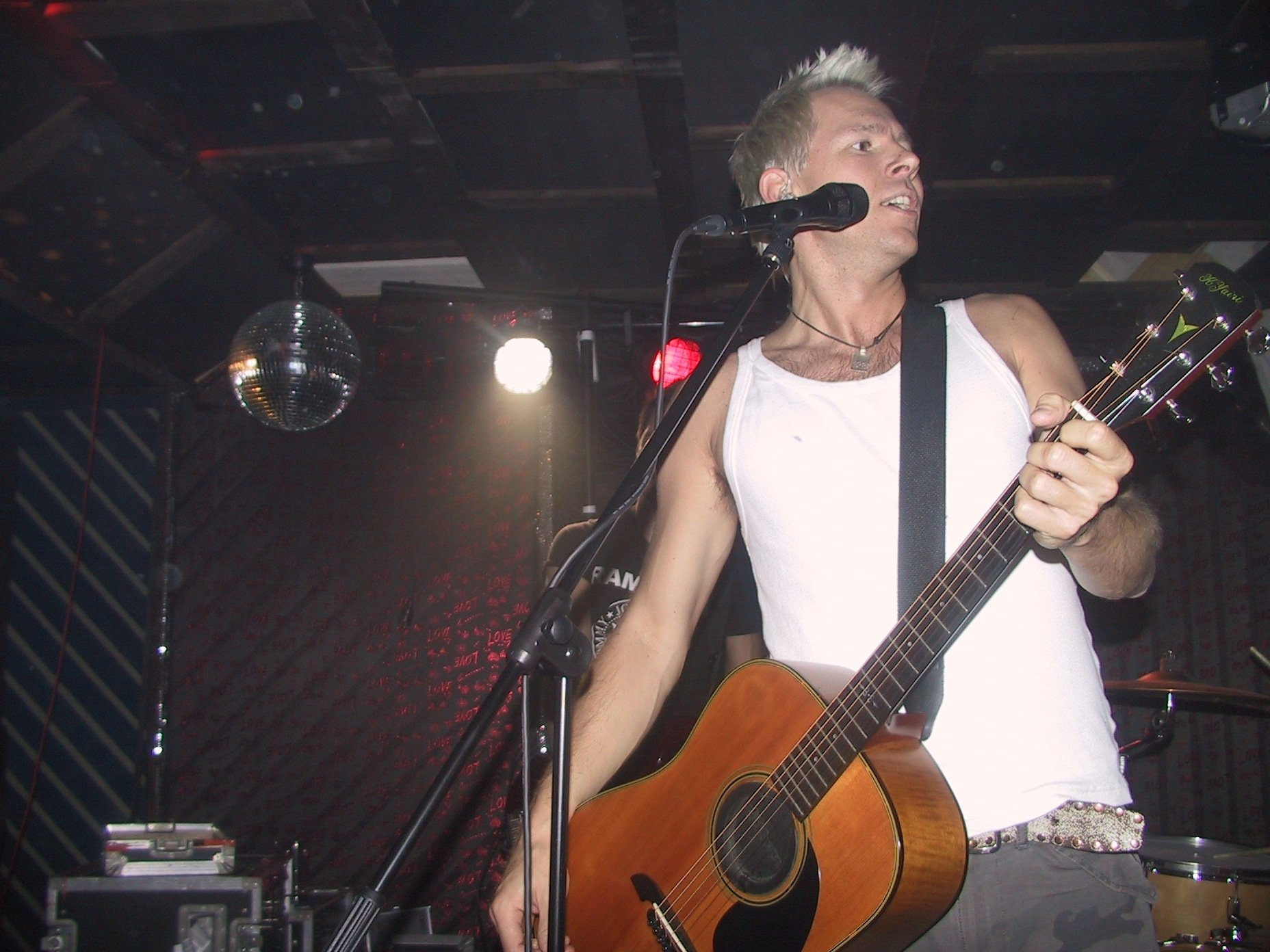
- Björn Rosenström at the restaurant in Arvika 2006

Background information
- Born: August 8, 1970 (age 55); Tynnered, Sweden
- Occupation(s): singer, songwriter
- Instrument: guitar

Björn Rosenström, born August 8, 1970, in the boroughs Tynnered in Gothenburg who resides in Bollebygd, is a Swedish songwriter who has performed as troubadour. Nowadays, he is a part of Det jävla bandet during concerts and on the latest records. In Det jävla bandet, his brother Mark Lindvall also plays.

In addition to being a songwriter and performer, he is also a lawyer; he has a Candidate of Law-degree from the University of Gothenburg. Rosenström studied law 1991-1996, while he was actively involved in the university's pub business, where he quickly became known for his ironic and humorous songs that he performed on guitar in various celebrations. He says that he is the person who likes to study others, especially in pub environments among drunk people.

When Björn Rosenström graduated in 1996, he went into a recording studio with his brother Jonas and started recording the album Låtar som är sådär. The disc took just one and a half days to do. Rosenström published 1,000 copies of the discs that he sold at his old university's pub and bookstore.

Jonas Rosenström was the cornerstone of Rosenström Musik and a member in Det Jävla bandet until the spring of 2011, when he decided to go for a new career.

During 2011, Rosenström toured with Det jävla bandet in Sweden.

== Members in the band ==
- Björn Rosenström – guitar & singer
- Johan Strömberg – bass
- Markus Netterlid Lindvall – drums
- Fredrik Lidin – guitar, mandolin & choir
- Pär Edwardson – guitar & choir
- Håkan Svensson – guitar & choir
- Nicklas Arlevall – sound engineer & tour manager
- Robert Ölund och Jonas Hedlund – backline engineer
- Jonas Rosenström – honorary member)

== Discography ==
- Låtar som är sådär (1996)
- Någorlunda hyggliga låtar (2000)
- Glove Sex Guy (2001)
- Var får jag allt ifrån? – En så kallad samling (2003)
- Pop på Svenska (2004)
- Syster Gunbritts hemlighet (2006)
- Ett jubileum som är sådär – 10½ år med Björn Rosenström (2007)
- Älska Hestrafors (singel) (2009)
- Swingersklubb in the Radhuslänga (2010)
- Olämpliga låtar (2012)
- Vad Tänkte Jag Med? (singel) (2012)
- Jul i Göteborg (singel) (2013)
- Tuff pipa (2015)
- Cuatro Klamydias (singel) (2016)
- 30 dårar (singel) (2021)
- Torskarna (singel) (2022)
