= Napoleon Distributing the Legion of Honour at the Camp of Boulogne =

1806 painting by Philippe-Auguste Hennequin

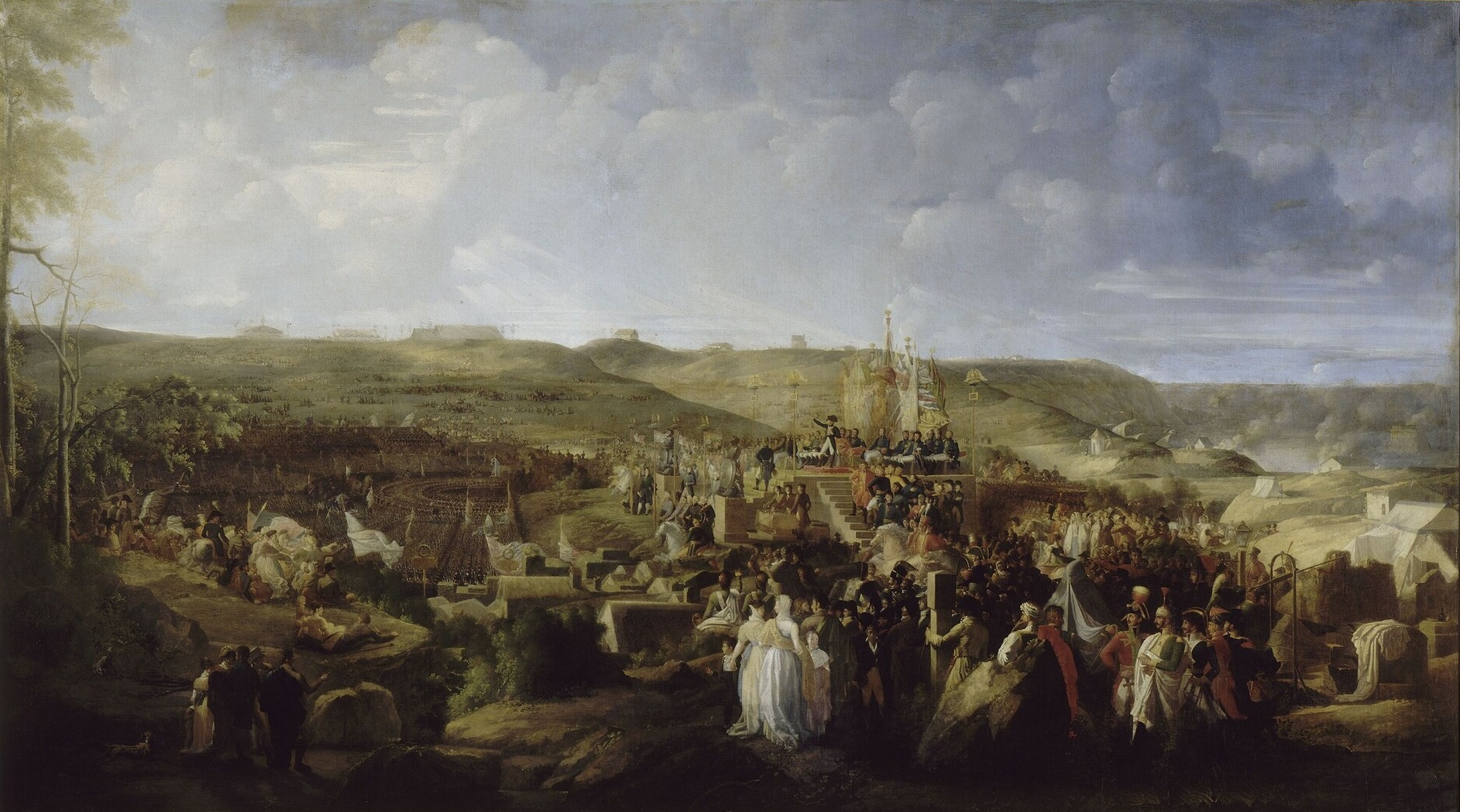
- Artist: Philippe-Auguste Hennequin
- Year: 1806
- Type: Oil on canvas, history painting
- Dimensions: 319 cm × 483 cm (126 in × 190 in)
- Location: Palace of Versailles, Versailles

Napoleon Distributing the Legion of Honour at the Camp of Boulogne (French: Napoléon Ier distribue les croix de la légion d'honneur au camp de Boulogne) is an 1806 history painting by the French artist Philippe-Auguste Hennequin. It depicts a scene from the Napoleonic Wars on 16 August 1804 at the Camp of Boulogne. The Grande Armée gathered for Napoleon's planned invasion of Britain took part in an elaborate ceremony. The Emperor is shown distributing the newly-created Legion of Honour. Also present is Napoleon's elder brother Joseph Bonaparte, later King of Spain.

The picture was commissioned by Bernard Germain de Lacépède, the Grand Chancellor of the Legion of Honour. The artist had witnessed the ceremony. The painting was exhibited at the Salon of 1806 at the Louvre in Paris. In 1834 it was acquired for the new Musée de l'Histoire de France at the Palace of Versailles.

== Bibliography ==
- Dwyer, Philip. Citizen Emperor: Napoleon in Power. Yale University Press, 2013.
- Hornstein, Katie. Picturing War in France, 1792–1856. Yale University Press, 2018.
- Hughes, Michael J. Forging Napoleon's Grande Armée: Motivation, Military Culture, and Masculinity in the French Army, 1800-1808. NYU Press, 2023.
- Siegfried, Susan L. Ingres: Painting Reimagined. Yale University Press, 2009
