= Per Ankersjö =

Swedish politician

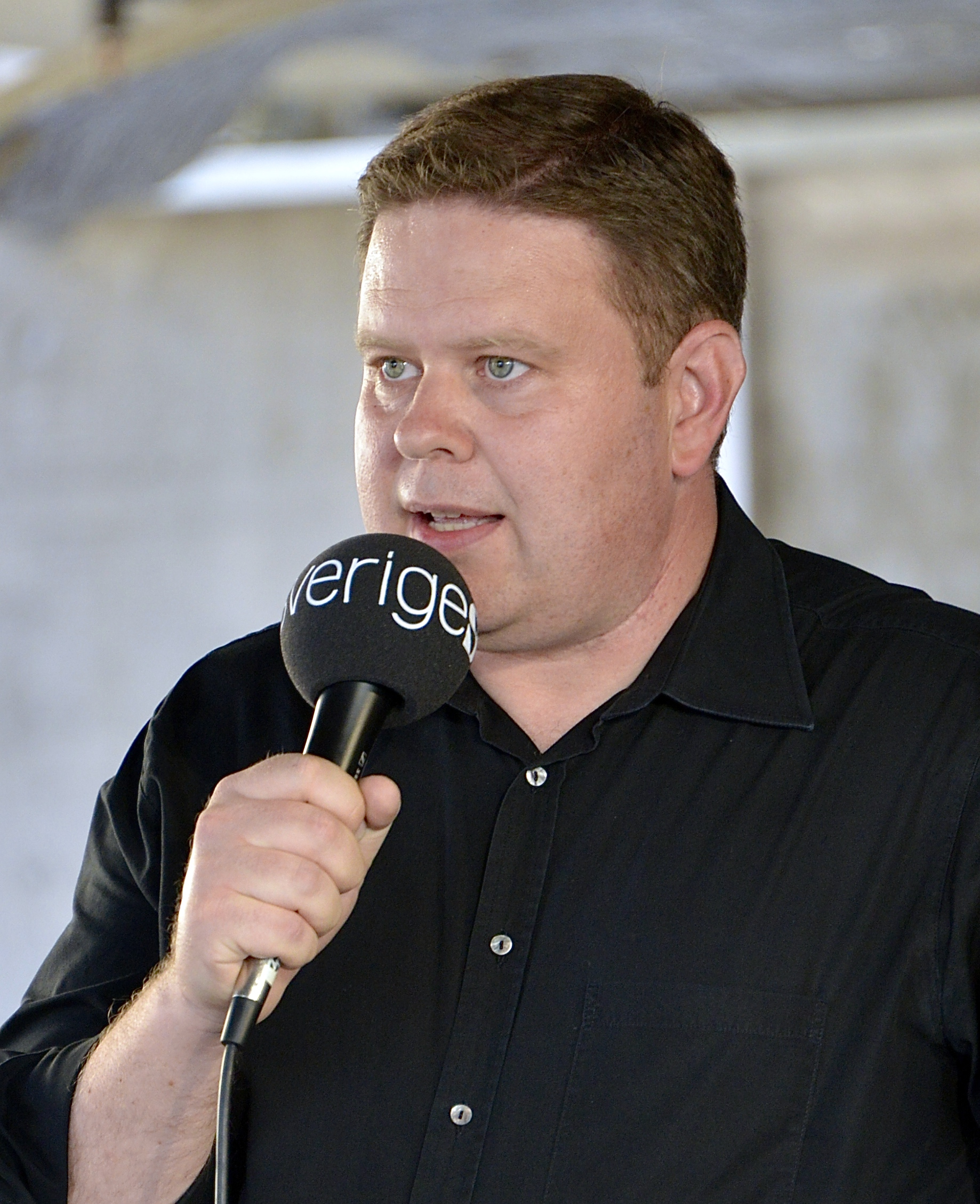
Per Ankersjö

Per Ankersjö (born 1971) is a Swedish politician. He is a member of the Centre Party. He was elected to the Stockholm City Council after the 2006 elections and re-elected in the 2010 elections. During the years 2010–2014 he served as Vice Mayor for Environment in the City of Stockholm. Ankersjö was chairman and leader of the Centre Party in Stockholm from 2003 until 2015, when he left to start his own consulting agency.
