= Pagan (band) =

Australian band

- Origin: Melbourne, Victoria, Australia
- Genres: Heavy metal, disco, punk rock
- Years active: 2013–2020
- Labels: Hassle
- Past members: Nikki Brumen; Xavier Santilli; Dan Bonnici; Matt Morasco

Pagan were an Australian band from Melbourne, Victoria formed in 2013. Their music merges the sounds of black metal, disco and punk rock. Their track "Heavy Repeater" peaked at number one on Triple J's punk/metal chart.

The band announced their decision to break up in January 2020, following a final show.

== History ==
Pagan were formed in 2013 as a reaction against the Melbourne metalcore scene, which the members believe to be too limiting, both stylistically and culturally. Santilli, Bonnici and Morasco had been playing music in bands for around twenty years prior to the forming the band, and Brumen has been playing for half a decade. In March 2015, they released their debut self-titled EP. The EP included the single "Heavy Repeater", which reached number one on Triple J's punk/metal chart soon after.

On 6 July 2018, they released their debut album Black Wash through Hassle Records. In August 2018, they headlined a tour of Australia. In November and December 2018, the band headlined a tour of the U.K. and Europe with support from Phoxjaw, Old Blue Last and Mother's Ruin. During this time, the track 'Imitate Me' reached the top spot of the Kerrang! Rock Chart. In May 2019, they toured the U.K., playing festivals such as Slam Dunk Festival and The Great Escape Festival, and opened for Microwave on their European headline tour. After returning from tour, bassist Dan Bonnici had his bass and a remote power supply stylized after the band's logo stolen from his car outside his home in Melbourne. In September 2019, they toured Australia in support of the Amity Affliction.

On 12 January 2020, the band announced their decision to break up after one farewell show. The show, at the John Curtin Bandroom in Melbourne, sold out on the day tickets went on sale - leading the band to add a second show the night before at The Workers Club. Vocalist Nikki has since gone on to join Norwegian punk band Blood Command.

== Musical style ==
The band's music took from genres such as punk rock, disco, black metal and metalcore. In an article for Kerrang!, they were described as a merger between the sounds of Marmozets, Møl and Employed to Serve. David James Young, writing for Tone Deaf, said they were "either the most accessible or melodic band on a heavy bill or the heaviest band on a mixed rock bill – there is never any in-between". They have been categorised as death–disco, blackened punk ’n’ roll, punk rock, hardcore punk and heavy metal. They self-describe their music as "blackened rock 'n' roll".

== Members ==
- Nikki Brumen – lead vocals
- Xavier Santilli – guitar, backing vocals
- Dan Bonnici – bass, backing vocals
- Matt Morasco – drums

== Discography ==
Albums

- Black Wash (2018)

EPs

- Pagan (2015)
