= Petter Mejlænder =

Norwegian writer and journalist

Petter Mejlænder (born 1 May 1952) is a Norwegian journalist, author and translator.

Petter Mejlænder has worked as a freelance journalist for several news-agencies. His debut as a writer was Out – a mythical lifespan in 1976 and he translated books by German psychiatrist Wilhelm Reich, documentary writer Günter Wallraff and the author Hermann Hesse to Norwegian. Mejlænder has also worked as a literary and theater critic. Among his latest books and articles are the biographies of Pushwagner

From 1980 Petter Mejlænder worked for the Norwegian Government Information Centre, and from 1987 as information manager for several Norwegian governments, including being the first leader of the government's emergency information centre. Mejlænder was from 1991 to 2000 employed as a journalist at NRK P2, a cultural radio channel, where he primarily worked with cultural news and special programs.

Mejlænder was editor of the newspaper "Den nye staten" (The new state) and has for several years held speeches for Norwegian Humanist Association's events. He is also chairman of the Norwegian Zola-prisen (Zola-award) committee.

Petter Mejlænder lives in Bærum southwest of Oslo, Norway.

== Bibliography ==
- 1976: Ut – et mytisk livsløp – published by "Solum forlag".
- 1998: Våre verdier – published by "Humanist forlag".
- 2002: Livet sett fra Nimbus – conversations with Axel Jensen, published by "Spartacus forlag".
- 2004: Nærkontakt : Wenche Foss & Arne Næss – conversations with the actress Wenche Foss and the philosopher Arne Næss, published by "Kagge forlag".
- 2005: Timotei : den lille filosofen – in cooperation with the philosopher Arne Næss and his wife Kit-Fai Næss, published by "Kagge forlag".
- 2007: Den lille filosofen : the story of Arne Næss and the cloth-pig Timotei, published by "Kagge forlag".
- 2008: Pushwagner – a biography about the Norwegian pop-art artist Hariton Pushwagner, published by "Magikon forlag" (also translated to English).

== Translations ==
- 1977: Wilhelm Reich: Hør her, lille mann.
- 1979: Hermann Hesse: Eventyr (also published 1991 and 2000).
