= Per Eberhard Cogell =

Swedish painter and teacher who worked in France (1734–1812)

Per Eberhard Cogell (1734 in Stockholm – 21 January 1812, in Lyon) was a Swedish artist who is one of the Swedish artists who were attracted by France throughout the eighteenth century. He worked in France.

== Biography ==
Cogell was born in Stockholm, and was a pupil of Jacques-Philippe Bouchardon and Pierre Hubert L'Archevêque at Royal Swedish Academy of Arts, becoming later a student of Gustav Lundberg. He received grants from the Swedish state and studied at the Academy of Copenhagen between 1763 and 1764, and between 1764 and 1766 with Joseph Marie Vien in Paris. From 1764 he settled for the rest of his life in Lyon and was, among other things, a teacher at the city's drawing and painting school.

Cogells production, which mainly consisted of portraits of Vienna's atmosphere, has largely been lost. Museums and the Academy of Lyon has some samples of his paintings. Even the Gothenburg Museum of Art has a portrait of Cogell. He is said also to have emerged as the landscape painter. Among today's lost paintings by Cogell, there is a portrait of Jean-Jacques Rousseau, one of Marie Antoinette, and an 1803 self-portrait submitted to the Swedish Academy.
