= Petter Eide =

Norwegian politician (born 1959)

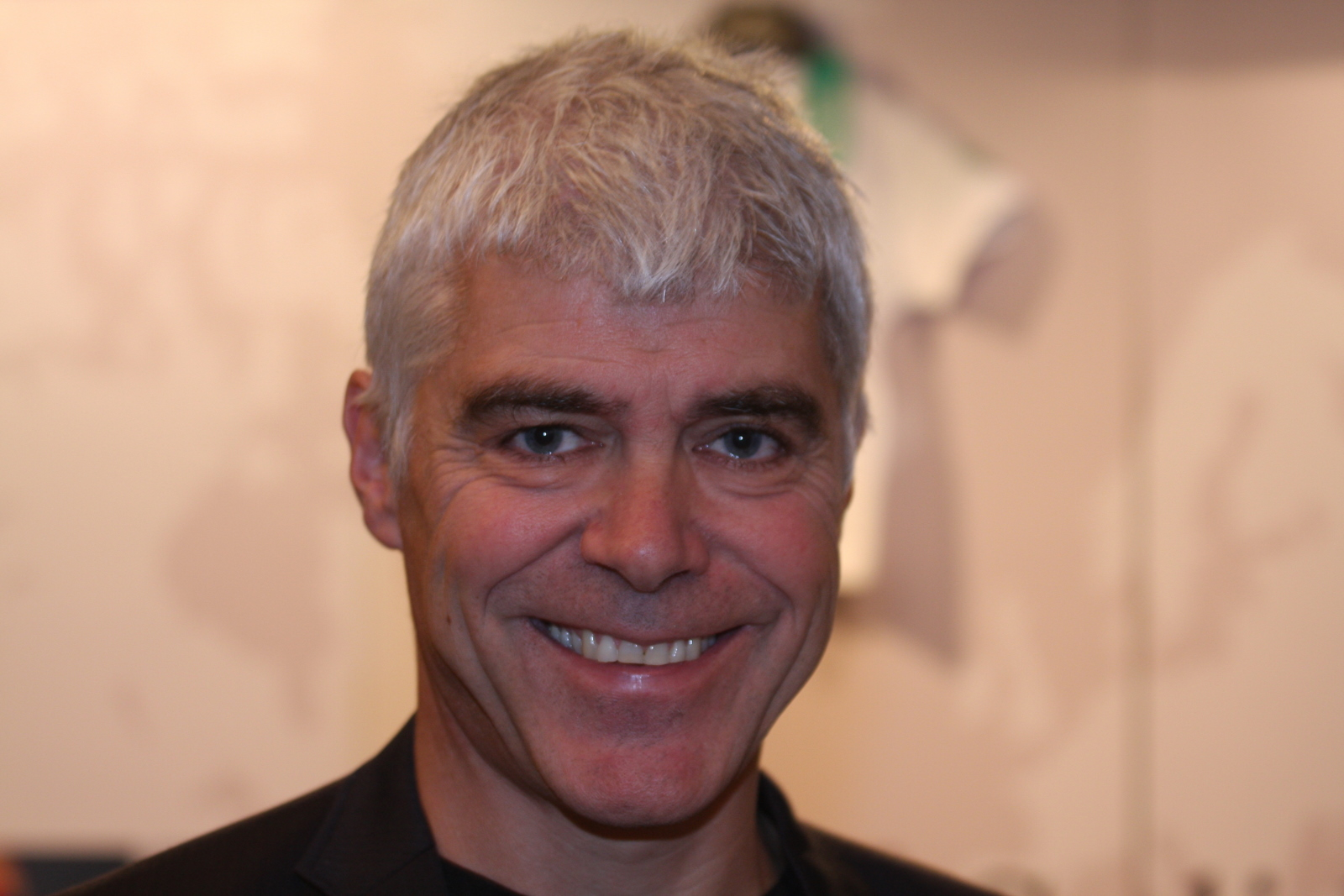
Petter Eide 2010

Petter Eide (born 15 August 1959) is a Norwegian politician, member of Parliament, representing the Socialist Left Party since 2017.

He is known to the Norwegian public also as Secretary General of the Norwegian branch of Amnesty International from 2000 to 2007, the Norwegian branch of Care International to 2008 and Norsk Folkehjelp from 2008 to 2010. With a teacher's education from 1983 he started his career in the school system. From 1986 to 1991 he worked as political secretary for the Socialist Left Party, and from 1992 to 1994 in Nei til EU. In 1994 he also took the cand.polit. degree at the University of Oslo. He worked in Geelmuyden.Kiese from 1997 to 2000.

In January 2006 he criticized the government of Norway for not following the example of the new German Chancellor Angela Merkel in opposing the Guantanamo Bay policy decision of the United States.
