= Pehr =

Pehr is a predominantly Swedish language masculine give name and may refer to:

- Pehr Adlerfelt (1680–1743), Swedish Army colonel
- Pehr von Afzelius (1760–1843), Swedish medical doctor and professor
- Pehr Victor Edman (1916—1977), Swedish biochemist
- Pehr von Ehrenheim (1823–1918), Swedish politician
- Pehr Forsskål (also known as Peter Forsskål; 1732–1763), Swedish-Finnish explorer, orientalist and naturalist
- Pehr Götrek (1798–1876), Swedish Christian communist
- Pehr Gyllenhammar (1901–1988), Swedish businessman
- Pehr G. Gyllenhammar (born 1935), Swedish businessman
- Pehr Harbury (born 1965), American biochemist
- Pehr Hilleström (1732–1816), Swedish artist
- Pehr Ferdinand Holm (1844–1917), Swedish-born New Zealand mariner
- Pehr G. Holmes (1881–1952), Swedish-born American politician
- Pehr Hörberg (1746–1816), Swedish painter and musician
- Pehr Janse (1893–1961), Swedish Army major general
- Pehr Kalm (1716–1779), Finnish explorer and naturalist
- Pehr Henrik Ling (1776–1839), Swedish physical education teacher
- Pehr Löfling (1729–1756), Swedish botanist
- Pehr Magnebrant (born 1970), Swedish golfer
- Pehr Henrik Nordgren (1944–2008), Finnish composer
- Pehr Osbeck (1723–1805), Swedish explorer and naturalist
- Pehr August Peterson (1846–1927), Swedish-born American businessman, civic leader and philanthropist
- Pehr Philander (c. 1757–1811), Dutch slave
- Pehr Qværnstrøm (1878–1949), Norwegian actor, film director and scriptwriter
- Pehr Herman Rosén von Rosenstein (1763–1799), Swedish military officer and colonial administrator
- Pehr Arvid Säve (1811–1887), Swedish teacher, cultural historian and artist
- Pehr Evind Svinhufvud (1861–1944), Prime Minister and third President of Finland
- Pehr Wilhelm Wargentin (1717–1783), Swedish astronomer and demographer

== See also ==
- Per
- Pär
- Peter
