= Pär Mikaelsson =

Swedish ice hockey player

- Born: March 5, 1970 (age 55); Sweden
- Height: 6 ft 1 in (185 cm)
- Weight: 198 lb (90 kg; 14 st 2 lb)
- Position: Right wing
- Shot: Left
- SEL team: Skellefteå AIK
- Playing career: 1989–2005

Pär Mikaelsson (born March 5, 1970), is a retired ice hockey player who spent 16 seasons with Skellefteå AIK and holds the club record for career goals (212) and career assists (253).

At the start of Pär's career he played 4 Elitserien games before Skellefteå was relegated to Allsvenskan in 1989. From 2003 to 2005 he participated in Kvalserien with Skellefteå who were unable to get back to Elitserien in all three years. Following Pär's retirement, Skellefteå qualified for Elitserien the very next year.
