= Petros (given name) =

Petros, the original Greek version of the name Peter meaning "stone" or "rock". It is also an Armenian, Coptic, and archaic Spanish name. It may refer to:

- Petros I (disambiguation)
- Petros II (disambiguation)
- Petros III (disambiguation)
- Petros IV (disambiguation)
- Petros V (disambiguation)
- Petros VI (disambiguation)
- Petros (Petik), Armenian merchant magnate of late 16th and first half of the 17th centuries
- Petros Adamian (1849–1891), Armenian actor, writer and artist
- Petros Avetisyan (born 1996), Armenian footballer
- Petros Bereketis (c. 1665–c. 1725), Greek-Ottoman musician
- Petros Byzantios (fl. 1770–1808), Greek-Ottoman musician
- Petros Clerides (born 1946), former attorney general of Cyprus
- Petros Duryan (1851–1872), Armenian poet, playwright and actor
- Petros Elia of Baz (1880–1932), Assyrian military leader
- Petros Fyssoun (1933–2016), Greek actor
- Petros Galaktopoulos (born 1945), Greek Olympic Greco-Roman wrestler
- Petros Ichkos (c. 1755–1808), Serbian-Ottoman diplomat and merchant
- Petros Mantalos (born 1991), Greek footballer
- Petros Matheus dos Santos Araújo (born 1989), Brazilian footballer
- Petrobey Mavromichalis (1765–1848), Greek prime minister originally named Petros
- Petros Molyviatis (1928–2025), Greek politician and diplomat
- Petros Noeas (born 1987), Greek professional basketball player
- Petros Palian (1931–2023), Iranian Armenian cinematographer
- Petros Papadakis (born 1977), American sportscaster
- Petros Peloponnesios (c. 1735–1778), Greek teacher of Byzantine and Ottoman music
- Petros Petrosyan (1968–2012), Armenian painter
- Petros Protopapadakis (1854–1922), Greek prime minister
- Pete Sampras (born 1971), American tennis player
- Petros Serghiou Florides (1937–2023), Cypriot mathematical physicist
- Petros Sithole, South African politician first elected in 2009
- Petros Solomon (born 1951), Eritrean politician
- Petros Tsitsipas (born 2000), Greek tennis player
- Petros Vassiliadis (born 1945), Greek biblical scholar and author
