= Colonia in Armenia =

Town of ancient Lesser Armenia

Coordinates: 40°18′25″N 38°24′46″E

Colonia or Koloneia, also called Colonia in Armenia (Armenian: Կոլոնիա) to distinguish it from other towns of the same name, was a town of ancient Lesser Armenia, inhabited during Hellenistic, Roman, and Byzantine times. It became important enough to be the seat of a bishop, a suffragan in the Late Roman Province of Armenia Prima, but faded like most in Asia Minor. No longer a residential bishopric, it remains, under the name Colonia in Armenia, a titular see of the Roman Catholic Church.

Its site is located near Şebinkarahisar in Asiatic Turkey.

== Titular see ==
In the late 19th century, the diocese was nominally restored as an Armenian Catholic titular bishopric of Colonia. As such it has incumbent of the lowest (episcopal) rank:

- Santiago Costamagna, Salesians (S.D.B.) (1895.03.18 – 1921.12.09)
- Edward Francis Hoban (1921.11.21 – 1928.02.21) (later Archbishop)

In 1929 it was promoted to titular archbishopric, in 1933 renamed Colonia in Armenia, avoiding confusion with Colonia in Cappadocia or German Colonia (Cologne). As such it is vacant, having had the following incumbents of the intermediary (archiepiscopal) rank :

- Vahan Kitchourian (1930.05.03 – 1931.06.08)
- Pietro Kedigian (1936.07.24 – 1957.09.17)
- Louis Batanian (1959.04.24 – 1962.09.04), as Auxiliary Eparch of Cilicia of the Armenians (patriarchate, actually in Beirut, Lebanon) (1959.04.24 – 1962.09.04); previously Archeparch of Mardin of the Armenians (1933.08.05 – 1940.08.10), Titular Archbishop of Gabula (1940.08.10 – 1952.12.06), Archeparch of Aleppo of the Armenians (Syria) (1952.12.06 – 1959.04.24); later Patriarch of Cilicia of the Armenians (Lebanon) ([1962.09.04] 1962.11.15 – 1976.04.22) as Ignatius (Iknadios) Bédros XVI Batanian and President of Synod of the Armenian Catholic Church (1969 – 1976.04.22)
- Paul Coussa (1969.08.26 – 1983.06.27)
