= Massis (periodical) =

Armenian Catholic publication in Beirut, Lebanon

Massis Մասիս

- Cover of 70th anniversary issue of Massis (January / February 2017)
- Frequency: Monthly
- First issue: 1947; 79 years ago
- Country: Lebanon
- Based in: Beirut
- Language: Western Armenian
- Website: massismagazine.com

Massis (in Armenian Մասիս) is a Lebanese-Armenian publication published by the Armenian Catholic Patriarchate in Lebanon.

== History and profile ==
Massis was established in 1947 by Cardinal Gregorio Pietro Agagianian in Beirut. A long-serving editor of the publication was Father Antranik Granian. It stopped publication temporarily in the 1990s and restarted in 2005, with Sarkis Najarian as editor in chief.

Massis is a religious, political, social and cultural periodical published with varying frequencies (weekly, bi-weekly, monthly) and at times as a tabloid newspaper and as a magazine.

Presently it is published on a monthly basis (12 issues per year), sometimes, with two months in one combined issue, with pages varying between 48 and 60 magazine-size pages.

== See also ==
- List of magazines in Lebanon
- Avedik
- Armenian Catholic Church
