= Bedros I =

Bedros I may refer to:

- Peter I of Armenia (died 1058), i.e. Bedros I Ketadarz, Catholicos of All Armenians in 1019–1058
- Abraham Petros I Ardzivian (1679–1749), Patriarch Catholicos of Cilicia in 1740–1749
