= Armenian Catholic Eparchy of Kharput =

The Armenian Catholic Eparchy of Kharput was a modern eparchy (Eastern Catholic diocese) and remains a titular see of the Armenian Catholic Church (sui iuris (Armenian Rite in Armenian language). Its seat was in Harpoot, Ottoman Empire, near present-day Elazığ, Turkey.

== History ==
It was created on 1 May 1850, on territory in Turkey previously without proper Ordinary of the particular church.

At the start of 1915, the eparchy had approximately 4,000 faithful Armenian Catholics, divided into 8 parishes, administered partly by Armenian clergy and partly by Capuchin friars. There was no seminary, and seminarians were sent to study either in Rome or at the patriarchal seminary in Bzoummar. The eparchy also oversaw 15 Catholic schools, attended by Catholics of all rites, and even some Muslims. This all changed starting in April 1915, when the Armenian Genocide began. The Armenian community in Kharput ceased to exist by the end of the year.

The final bishop was the martyr Stefano P. Israelian, killed by firing squad during persecution by the Turks in June 1915. Vacant since 1915, the eparchy was formally suppressed 1972.

=== Bishops ===
1. Stefano A. Israelian (1865.05.09 - 1888)
2. Avedis Petros XIV Arpiarian (1890.09.23 – 1898.04.05), later Titular Archbishop of Anazarbus of the Armenians (1898.04.05 – 1911.08.27), Eparch (Bishop) of Marasc of the Armenians (1911.08.27 – 1928.06.29), Auxiliary Bishop of the Patriarchate Cilicia of the Armenians (Lebanon) (1928.06.29 – 1931.10.17), Patriarch of Cilicia of the Armenians (Lebanon) ([1931.10.17] 1933.03.13 – 1937.10.26)
3. Stefano P. Israelian (1899.02.06 – death 1915)

== Titular see ==
It is now a titular see, from the date of suppression.

It remains vacant, without a single incumbent.

== Source and External links ==
- GCatholic, with incumbent biography links
