= Avedik =

Avedik Աւետիք
- Frequency: Periodical (varying)
- Publisher: Armenian Catholic Patriarchate
- Founder: Avedis Petros XIV Arpiarian
- Founded: 1932; 94 years ago
- Country: Lebanon
- Based in: Beirut
- Language: Western Armenian

Avedik (in Armenian Աւետիք) is a Lebanese-Armenian publication published by the Armenian Catholic Patriarchate in Lebanon and the official organ of the Armenian Catholic Church worldwide.

The publication began as a patriarchal magazine in the 1932 by Catholicos Patriarch Avedis Petros XIV Arpiarian, for whom it is now named.

Licensed as a monthly publication, the religious Armenian-Catholic publication is now published with varying frequencies (monthly, bi-monthly, quarterly, semi-annually, annually) as a small-size periodical.

== See also ==
- Massis (periodical)
