= Avedis Petros XIV Arpiarian =

His Beatitude Avedis Petros XIV Arpiarian
- Catholicos-Patriarch of Cilicia
- Native name: Աւետիս Պետրոս ԺԴ. Արփիարեան
- Church: Armenian Catholic Church
- See: Patriarchate of Cilicia
- Elected: October 17, 1931
- Term ended: October 26, 1937
- Predecessor: Boghos Bedros XIII Terzian
- Successor: Gregorio Pietro XV Agagianian
- Previous posts: Eparch of Kharput (1890-1898); Eparch of Marash (1911-1928)

Orders
- Ordination: March 1884
- Consecration: November 16, 1890 by Stephano Bedros X Azarian, Garabed Aslanian, & Moise Amberbojan

Personal details
- Born: April 13, 1856 Eğin, Ottoman Empire
- Died: October 26, 1937 (aged 81) Bzoummar, French Lebanon

Avedis Petros XIV Arpiarian (Western Armenian: Աւետիս Պետրոս ԺԴ. Արփիարեան; April 13, 1856 – October 26, 1937), was an Armenian Catholic patriarch and bishop. He was eparch of Kharput and Marash, and the fourteenth patriarch of the Armenian Catholic Church.

== Life ==
A native of Egin (now Kemaliye) in Turkey, Avetis Arpiarian was ordained a priest in March 1884. Arpirarian was appointed eparch of Karput on September 23, 1890. Avetis, like his relative Arpiar Arpiarian, was an author and writer. For this connection and his literary activity, he was invited by the Ottoman Sultan Abdul Hamid II to assume the position of Patriarchal Vicar of Cilicia in 1898. During this time he had the title of Titular Archbishop of the Armenian Catholic Archeparchy of Anzarbus.

From 1905 to 1909, the Archbishop was forced to live in exile in Bzoummar.

He was appointed eparch of Marash on August 27, 1911. During the Turkish persecution, the Armenian Genocide, he managed to escape from Marash only thanks to a French military escort. Upon the death of Boghos Bedros XIII Terzian, he was elected Patriarch of Cilicia, the leader of the Armenian Catholic Church on October 17, 1931, and confirmed by Pope Pius XI on March 13, 1933.

As patriarch, Arpiarian published a patriarchal magazine, which later became the official newspaper of the Armenian Catholic Church, called Avedik in honor of its founder. The newspaper is still published monthly by the Armenian Catholic Church in Beirut. From 1931 to 1937, he was simultaneously Archbishop of Beirut and Apostolic Administrator of the Armenian Catholic Eparchy of Isfahan in Iraq.

He died in Bzoummar on October 26, 1937.

Catholic Church titles
Preceded by Stefano A. Israelian	Exarch of Armenian Catholic Eparchy of Kharput; 1890–1898	Succeeded by Stefano P. Israelian
Preceded by Nobody	Titular Archeparch of Armenian Catholic Archeparchy of Anzarbus; 1898–1911; 1928–1937	Vacant
Preceded by Jean Muradian	Exarch of Armenian Catholic Eparchy of Marash; 1911–1928	Vacant
Preceded by Boghos Bedros XIII Terzian	Patriarch Catholicos of Cilicia; 1931–1937	Succeeded by Gregorio Pietro XV Agagianian
