= Ignatius Bedros XVI Batanian =

Head of the Armenian Catholic Church from 1962 to 1976

- Patriarch of Cilicia
- Native name: Հմայակ Պետրոս ԺԷ Կետիկյան
- Church: Armenian Catholic Church
- See: Patriarchate of Cilicia
- In office: 4 September 1962 – 22 April 1976
- Predecessor: Gregorio Pietro Agagianian
- Successor: Hemaiag Bedros XVII Ghedighian
- Previous posts: Titular Archeparch of Colonia in Armenia (1959-1962); Archeparch of Aleppo (1952-1959); Titular Archeparch of Gabula (1940-1952); Eparch of Mardin (1933-1940)

Orders
- Ordination: 29 June 1921
- Consecration: 29 October 1933 by Avedis Petros XIV Arpiarian

Personal details
- Born: 15 February 1899 Mardin, Diyarbekir vilayet, Ottoman Empire
- Died: 9 October 1979 (aged 80) Lebanon

Styles of Ignatius Petros XVI Batanian
- Reference style: His Beatitude
- Spoken style: Your Beatitude
- Religious style: Catholicos
- Posthumous style: N/A

Ignatius Bedros XVI Batanian (Armenian: Իգնատիոս Պետրոս ԺԶ Պաթանեան; French Ignace Pierre XVI Batanian; 15 February 1899 – 9 October 1979) was the Patriarch of Cilicia in the Armenian Catholic Church from 1962 until his resignation in 1976.

== Priesthood ==
He was born as Louis Batanian in Mardin, Ottoman Empire. He was ordained a priest in 1921 when he was 22 years old. He was consecrated as bishop on 29 October 1933, as Archbishop of Mardin of the Armenians (1933–1940) and titular Archbishop of Gabula (1940–1952). He was assigned Archbishop of Aleppo of the Armenians in northern Syria (1952–1959) and finally titular Archbishop of Colonia in Armenia (1959–1962).

He became Auxiliary Bishop of Cilicia of the Armenians (in Lebanon) on 24 April 1959 to Catholicos Cardinal Gregory-Petros XV Agagianian until 4 September 1962, when he was elected as Catholicos-Patriarch of the Armenian Catholics on that day. His official reign as Patriarch continued from 15 November 1962 until 22 April 1976 when he resigned because of legal age. He constructed the new convent of Bzommar and the Armenian Catholic orphanage of Anjar, Lebanon. He witnessed as Patriarch the first two very difficult years of the Lebanese Civil War.

== Death ==
He died on 9 October 1979 in Lebanon, aged 80.

== See also ==
- List of Armenian Catholic Patriarchs of Cilicia

Preceded by Gregory-Petros XV Agagianian	Patriarch Catholicos of Cilicia; 1962–1976	Succeeded by Hemaiag Petros XVII Ghedighian
