= See of Cilicia =

The See of Cilicia may refer to:

- Holy See of Cilicia, officially Armenian Catholicossate of the Great House of Cilicia, one of the two catholicossates of the Armenian Apostolic Church
- Armenian Catholic Patriarchate of Cilicia, called the Patriarchate of Cilicia, of the Armenian Catholic Church
