= Patriarch of Cilicia =

Patriarch of Cilicia may refer to:

- the Eastern Catholic Armenian Catholic Patriarch of Cilicia
- the Armenian Apostolic Catholicos of Cilicia
