= Petros III =

Petros III may refer to:

- Pope Peter III of Alexandria, ruled in 477–489
- Michael Petros III Kasparian, ruled in 1753–1780
