= Krikor Badichah =

Lebanese Armenian Catholic bishop (born 1983)

His Excellency Krikor Robert Badichah ICPB
- Auxiliary Bishop of Beirut of the Armenians
- Church: Armenian Catholic Church
- See: Titular See of Artvin degli Armeni
- Appointed: 3 April 2024
- Previous post: Rector of the Patriarchal Seminary of Bzommar (2019–2024)

Orders
- Ordination: 11 December 2010 by Nerses Bedros XIX Tarmouni
- Consecration: 26 May 2024 by Raphaël Bedros XXI Minassian

Personal details
- Born: 1 February 1983 (age 43) Beirut, Lebanon
- Education: Pontifical Armenian College, John Paul II Pontifical Theological Institute for Marriage and Family Sciences, Salesian Pontifical University

Krikor Robert Badichah ICPB (Armenian: Գրիգոր Ռոպէր Պատիշահ; born 1 February 1983) is a Lebanese hierarch of the Armenian Catholic Church who has served as Auxiliary Bishop of the Armenian Catholic Archeparchy of Beirut since 2024. He holds the titular see of Artvin degli Armeni. Age 41 at his consecration in May 2024, he became the youngest Catholic bishop in the world, and remains so as of 2026.

== Early life and education ==
Badichah was born on 1 February 1983 in Beirut, Lebanon. He entered the minor seminary of Bzommar, completing his secondary studies there. He pursued studies in philosophy and theology at Saint Paul University in Harissa-Daraoun.

In 2007, he was sent to Rome to study at the Pontifical Armenian College. He obtained a licentiate in the Social doctrine of the Catholic Church from the Pontifical Gregorian University, a licentiate in theology of the family from the John Paul II Pontifical Theological Institute for Marriage and Family Sciences, and a diploma as a formator from the Salesian Pontifical University.

== Priesthood ==
Badichah joined the Patriarchal Congregation of Bzommar (ICPB) with his deaconal ordination in 2009, and he was ordained to the priesthood on 11 December 2010 by Nerses Bedros XIX Tarmouni for the Institute of the Patriarchal Clergy of Bzommar. He initially served in a parish school in Zalka, Lebanon.

From 2011 to 2017, he was vice-rector of the Pontifical Armenian College in Rome. He later became rector of the Patriarchal Seminary of Bzommar and served as secretary of the Synod of Bishops of the Armenian Catholic Church.

== Episcopal ministry ==
On 3 April 2024, the Synod of Bishops of the Armenian Catholic Patriarchal Church of Cilicia elected Badichah as Auxiliary Bishop of the Patriarchal Archeparchy of Beirut of the Armenians. Pope Francis granted ecclesiastical communion and assigned him the titular see of Artvin degli Armeni.

He was consecrated a bishop on 26 May 2024 at the Patriarchal Convent of Bzommar. Age 41 at the time, he replaced Curial Bishop Jules Boutros of the Greek Orthodox Patriarchate of Antioch the youngest Catholic bishop in the world. (Note: Though Boutros was younger at his own consecration, age 39.)
