= Petros I =

Petros I may refer to:

- Pope Peter I of Alexandria, ruled in 300–311
- Petros I, Caucasian Albanian Catholicos in 971–987
- Abraham Petros I Ardzivian, ruled in 1740–1749
