= Hemaiag Bedros XVII Ghedighian =

Head of the Armenian Catholic Church from 1976 to 1982

Hemaiag Bedros XVII Ghedighian C.M.V.
- Patriarch of Cicilia
- Native name: Հմայակ Պետրոս ԺԷ Կետիկյան
- Church: Armenian Catholic Church
- See: Patriarchate of Cilicia
- In office: 3 July 1976 – 30 May 1982
- Predecessor: Ignatius Bedros XVI Batanian
- Successor: Hovhannes Bedros XVIII Kasparian
- Previous post: Titular Archeparch of Chersonesus in Zechia (1971-1976)

Orders
- Ordination: 19 October 1930
- Consecration: 30 May 1971 by Ignatius Bedros XVI Batanian

Personal details
- Born: 2 October 1905 Trabzon, Trebizond vilayet, Ottoman Empire
- Died: 28 November 1998 (aged 93)

Hemaiag Bedros XVII Ghedighian (Armenian: Հմայեակ Պետրոս ԺԷ. Կէտիկեան; 2 October 1905 – 28 November 1998) was the Patriarch of Cilicia in the Armenian Catholic Church from 1976 to 1982. He died in 1998 at the age of 93.

Ghedighian was ordained a priest in 1930 and became the abbot of the Venice Mekhitarist order. He was titular holder as Archbishop of Chersonesus in Zechia from 1971 until 1978, when he was elected patriarch of the Armenian Catholic Church. His reign took place entirely during the Lebanese Civil War.

== See also ==
- List of Armenian Catholic Patriarchs of Cilicia

Catholic Church titles
Preceded by Ignatius Bedros XVI Batanian	Patriarch Catholicos of Cilicia; 1976–1982	Succeeded by Hovhannes Bedros XVIII Kasparian
