= Stefano P. Israelian =

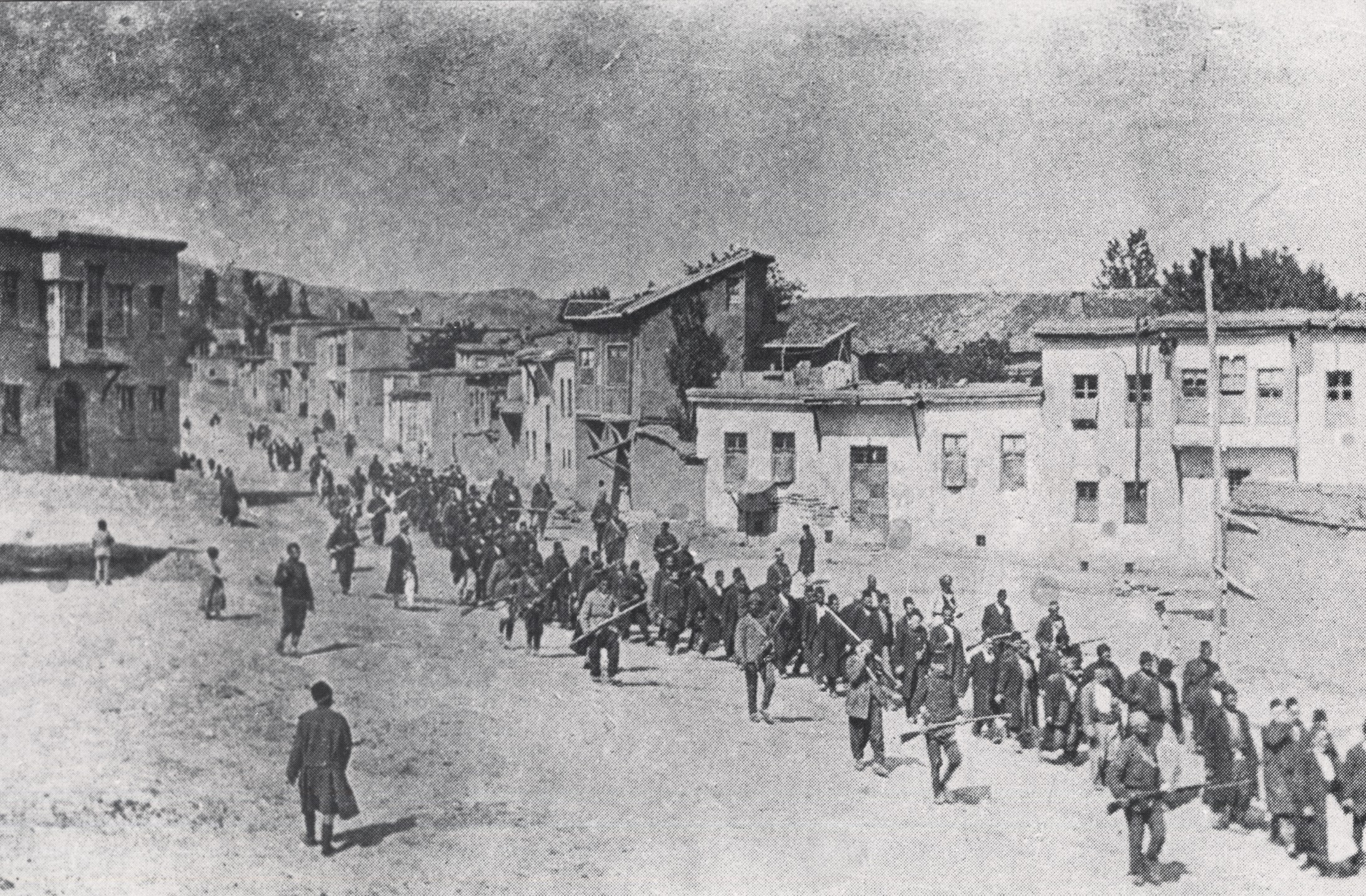
Ottoman military forces march Armenian men from Kharput to an execution site outside the city.

Stafano P. Israelian (February 15, 1866 - June 1915) was an Armenian Catholic bishop. He was the final bishop of the Armenian Catholic Eparchy of Kharput.

== Life and Martyrdom ==
Israelian was born in Mush, Ottoman Empire, on February 15, 1866. He was educated at the Pontifical Urban College for the Propagation of the Faith in Rome and ordained a priest in Constantinople on November 1, 1890.

On February 6, 1899, Israelian was appointed to succeed Avedis Arpiarian as bishop of Kharput, and he was ordained on May 14. He served as bishop for 16 years. In June 1915, during the Armenian Genocide, Israelian was killed by firing squad during a death march. According to Carl Wandel, Denmark's minister in Turkey, Israelian and all the other Armenian clergy of Kharput were killed between Tigranakert and Urfa. As all the Armenian Catholics of Kharput were either killed or fled the area, Israelian was never replaced as bishop.

== Legacy ==
While not individually canonized as a saint, Israelian and his fellow victims of persecution are commemorated by both the Armenian Catholic Church and the Armenian Apostolic Church on Armenian Martyrs' Day, April 24.
