= Petros II =

Petros II may refer to:

- Pope Peter II of Alexandria, ruled in 373–381
- Petros II, Caucasian Albanian Catholicos whose rule ended c. 1331
- Jacob Petros II Hovsepian, ruled in 1749–1753
