= Petros V =

Petros V may refer to:

- Patriarch Peter V of Alexandria (7th–8th centuries)
- Gregory Petros V Kupelian, Armenian Catholic Patriarch of Cilicia in 1788–1812
