= Diocese of Marash =

The diocese of Marash was an ecclesiastical jurisdiction in eastern Cilicia with its seat in the city of Marash (ancient Germanicia, now Kahramanmaraş). By the sixth century, it was an autocephalous archbishopric, but it fell into desuetude after the Arab conquest in the seventh century. The archdiocese was never revived.

Eudoxius of Antioch was the Arian bishop of Germanicia before becoming bishop of Antioch. Five bishops are known before the Arab conquest. In addition, 22 Syriac Orthodox bishops are known from the eighth to the thirteenth century. The city had an Armenian bishop at the time of the First Crusade (1096–1099). In 1100, the Armenian bishop gave assistance to Prince Bohemond I of Antioch against the Danishmendids.

A Latin bishop was appointed sometime between 1104 and 1114. He was subject to the Latin patriarch of Antioch, but his primary purpose may have been more strategic than religious, since Marash was the seat of a frontier lordship subject to the Principality of Antioch. An unnamed Latin bishop was killed in the earthquake of 1114. The city was conquered by the Sultanate of Rum in 1149 and the last resident Latin bishop was given a safeconduct only to be murdered on the road to Antioch.

In 1910, there was an Armenian Catholic diocese of Marash with about 6,000 parishioners out of a total Catholic population of 15,000 (and a total Christian population of 25,000 in a city of 52,000). The Armenian Sisters of the Immaculate Conception had a presence in the city.

The ancient Germanicia in Euphratensis is listed as a titular see of the Latin church. It has at times been conflated with the ancient see of Germaniciana in Africa.

== List of bishops ==
The following is a chronological list of "Greek" bishops of Germanicia from the fourth through sixth centuries:

- Salamanus, who attended the Council of Nicaea (325)
- Eudoxius
- Stephen
- John
- Thomas

The following is a chronological list of "Jacobite" (i.e., Syriac Orthodox) bishops of Marash from the eighth through thirteenth centuries mentioned in the Chronicle of Michael the Great:

- Habib
- Theodore
- Abraham
- Gabriel
- John (I)
- Joseph
- Moses
- Constantine
- John (II)
- Theodosius
- Gregory (Lazarus)
- Timothy (I)
- Philoxenus (I)
- Timothy (II)
- Philoxenus (II)
- Denis (James)
- Basil
- Ignatius

== Bibliography ==
- Asbridge, Thomas (2000). The Creation of the Principality of Antioch, 1098–1130. The Boydell Press. ISBN 978-0-85115-661-3.
- Beech, George T. (1996). "The Crusader Lordship of Marash in Armenian Cilicia, 1104–1149". Viator. 27: 35–52. doi:10.1484/j.viator.2.301121.
- Chabot, Jean-Baptiste (1901). "Les évèques jacobites du VIII^{e} au XIII^{e} siècle d'après la Chronique de Michel le Syrie (III)". Revue de l'Orient chrétien. 6: 189–220.
- Hamilton, Bernard (1980). The Latin Church in the Crusader States: The Secular Church. Ashgate.
- Le Quien, Michel (1740). Oriens Christianus, in quatuor Patriarchatus digestus: quo exhibentur ecclesiæ, patriarchæ, cæterique præsules totius Orientis. Tomus secundus, in quo Illyricum Orientale ad Patriarchatum Constantinopolitanum pertinens, Patriarchatus Alexandrinus & Antiochenus, magnæque Chaldæorum & Jacobitarum Diœceses exponuntur (in Latin). Paris: Ex Typographia Regia. OCLC 955922747.
- Mullen, Roderic L. (2004). The Expansion of Christianity: A Gazetteer of its First Three Centuries. Brill.
- Vailhé, Siméon (1909). "Germanicia" . In Herbermann, Charles (ed.). Catholic Encyclopedia. Vol. 6. New York: Robert Appleton Company. p. 475.
- Vailhé, Siméon (1910). "Marash" . In Herbermann, Charles (ed.). Catholic Encyclopedia. Vol. 9. New York: Robert Appleton Company. p. 26.
