= Petros IV =

Petros IV may refer to:

- Patriarch Peter IV of Alexandria, ruled in 642–651
- Basile Petros IV Avkadian, ruled in 1780–1788
