= Al-Jabbul =

Al-Jabbul الجبول
- Village
- Location in Syria
- Coordinates: 36°04′57.6″N 37°30′43.9″E
- Country: Syria
- Governorate: Aleppo
- District: Dayr Hafir
- Subdistrict: Kuweires Sharqi

Population (2004)
  - Total: 1,783

Al-Jabbul (Arabic: الجبول) is a Syrian village in the Aleppo Governorate to the north of Sabkhat al-Jabbul. The old city of Gabula used to host the Monastery of St. Isaac (Syriac: ܕܝܪܐ ܕܡܪܝ ܐܝܣܚܩ, romanized: Dayro d-Mor Isḥaq).

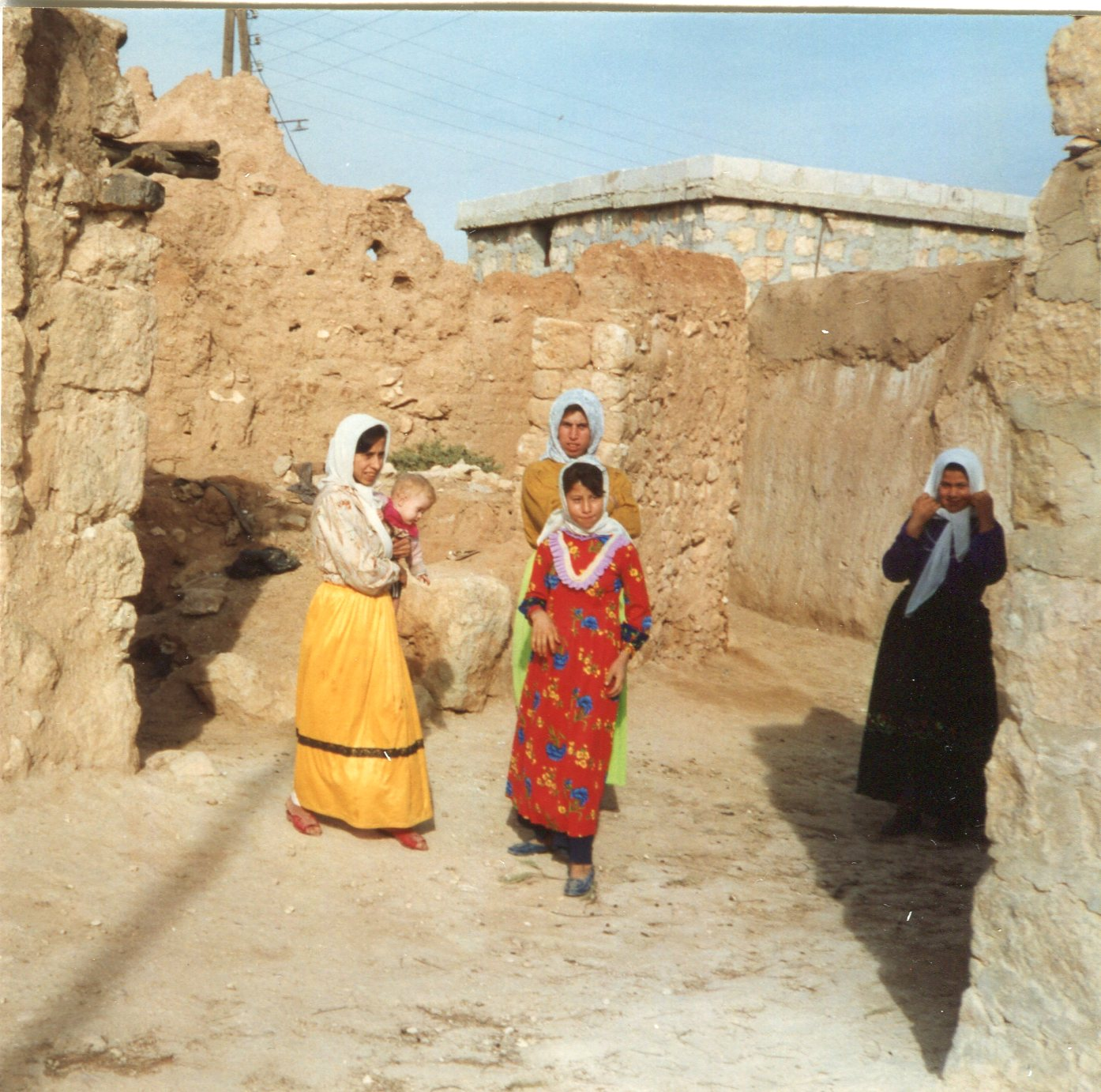

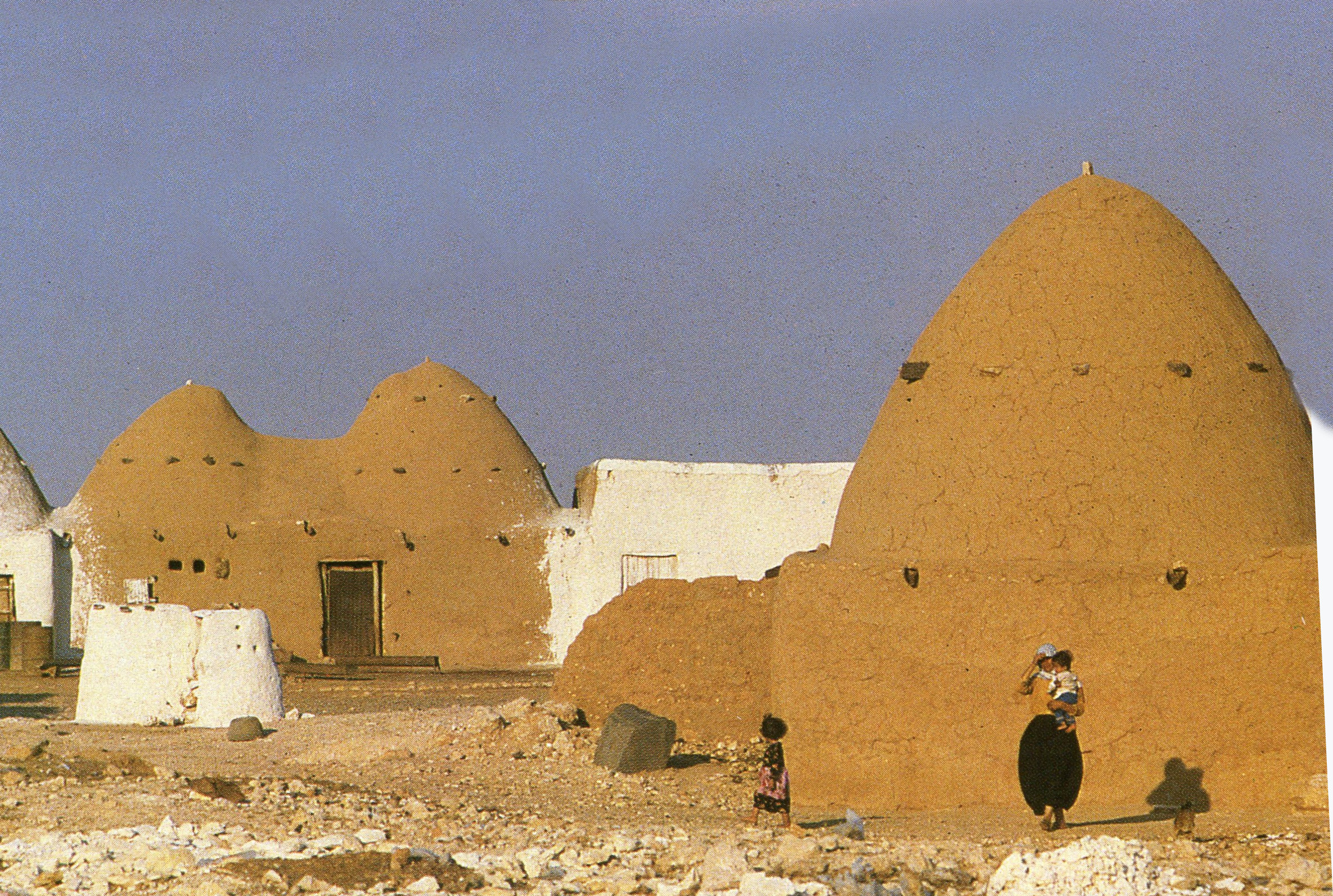

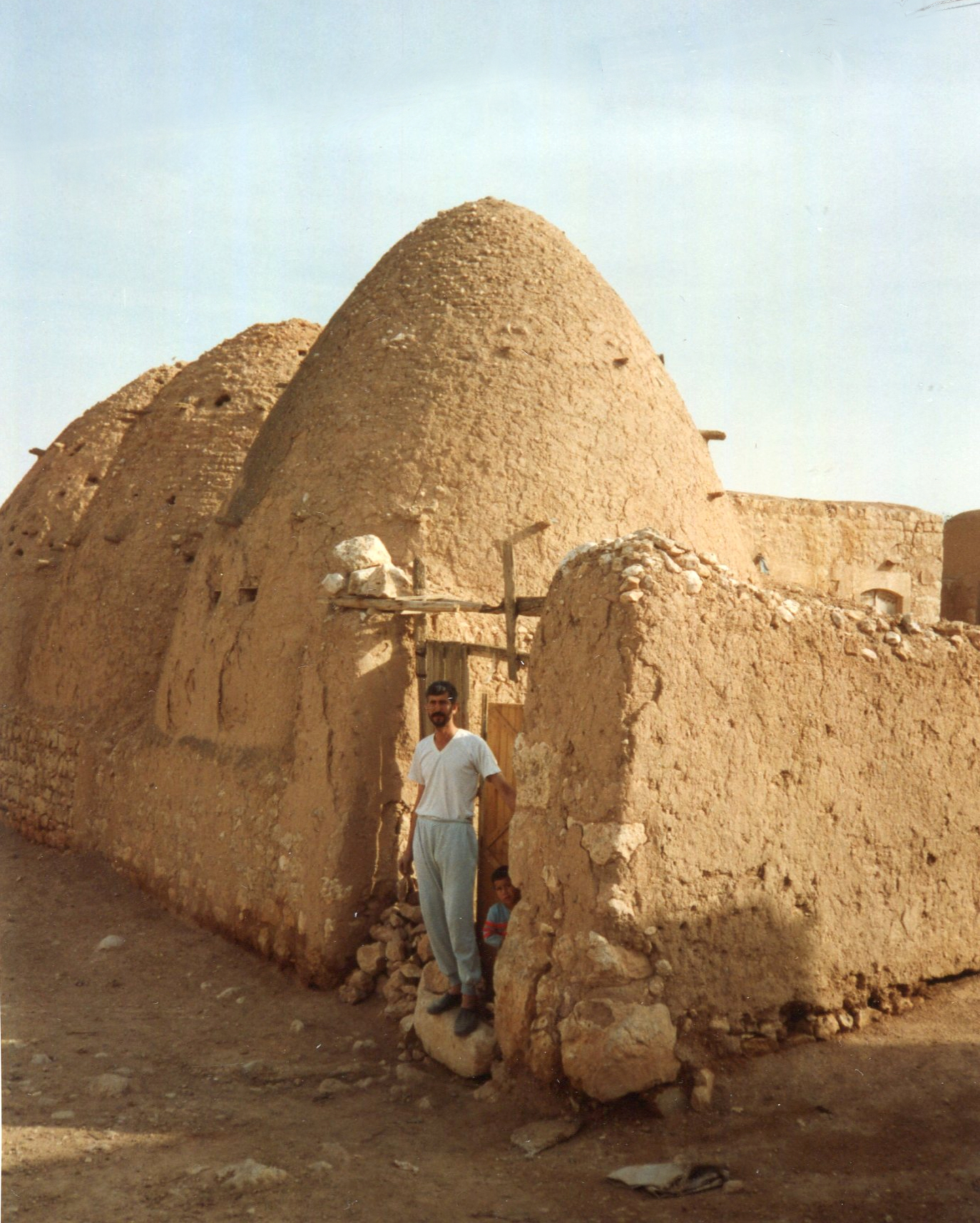
