= Petros VI =

Petros VI may refer to:

- Patriarch Peter VI of Alexandria (7th–8th centuries)
- Petros (VI?), Abuna of Ethiopia in 1599?–1606
- Pope Peter VI of Alexandria, ruled in 1718–1726
- Gregory Petros VI Djeranian, Armenian Catholic Patriarch of Cilicia in 1815–1841
