= Gabula (Syria) =

- Location within Syria
- 36.08°N 37.516389°E
- Location: Syria
- Region: Aleppo Governorate

Gabula was an ancient city and former bishopric in Roman Syria, and remains a Latin Catholic titular see.

Its modern location is presumed at the marsh of al-Jabbul (Sabkhat al-Jabbul, Djebbul, Djabbul) in present Syria.

== History ==
Gabula was important enough in the Roman province of Syria Prima to be a Metropolitan Archdiocese in the sway of the Patriarchate of Antioch (the provincial capital Antioch on the Orontes), but was to fade, presumably at the advent of Islam.

It has had two historically documented incumbents :

- Bassianus (Bassones), participant at the First Council of Nicaea in 325
- Flavianus, signator of the letter of the episcopate of Syria Secunda to Byzantine emperor Leo I the Thracian (457-474) in 458, after the lynch-mobbing by Copts of Patriarch Proterius of Alexandria.

== Titular see ==
The diocese was nominally restored in 1929 as a Latin Catholic titular archbishopric.

It is vacant since decades, having had the following incumbents, all of the intermediary (archiepiscopal) rank :

- Joseph Attipetty (1932.11.29 – 1934.11.15)
- Patrick Finbar Ryan, Dominican Order (O.P.) (1937.04.13 – 1940.06.06)
- Louis Batanian (1940.08.10 – 1952.12.06); previously Archeparch (Archbishop) of Mardin of the Armenians (1933.08.05 – 1940.08.10); later Archeparch of Aleppo of the Armenians (Syria) (1952.12.06 – 1959.04.24), Titular Archbishop of Colonia in Armenia of the Armenians (1959.04.24 – 1962.09.04) & Auxiliary Bishop of the patriarchate Cilicia of the Armenians (Lebanon) (1959.04.24 – 1962.09.04), Patriarch of Cilicia of the Armenians (Lebanon) ([1962.09.04] 1962.11.15 – 1976.04.22) and President of Synod of the Armenian Catholic Church (1969 – 1976.04.22)
- Pompeo Ghezzi (1953.10.25 – 1957.04.17)
- Aurelio Macedonio Guerriero (1957.05.25 – 1963.10.19)
- Francis Carroll, Society of African Missionaries (S.M.A.) (1964.01.14 – 1980.10.10)

== See also ==
- List of Catholic dioceses in Syria
- Gabala (another former archbishopric)
- Catholic Church in Syria

== Sources and external links ==
- GCatholic with titular incumbent biography links

Bibliography

- Pius Bonifacius Gams, Series episcoporum Ecclesiae Catholicae, Leipzig 1931, p. 434 (Gabba)
- Michel Lequien, Oriens christianus in quatuor Patriarchatus digestus, Paris 1740, vol. II, coll. 787-788
- Siméon Vailhé, Notes de géographie ecclésiastique, in Échos d'Orient, vol. IV (1900), p. 17.
