= Andon Bedros IX Hassoun =

Head of the Armenian Catholic Church from 1866 to 1881

His Eminence Andon Bedros IX Hassoun
- Cardinal-Priest of Santi Vitale, Valeria, Gervasio e Protasio
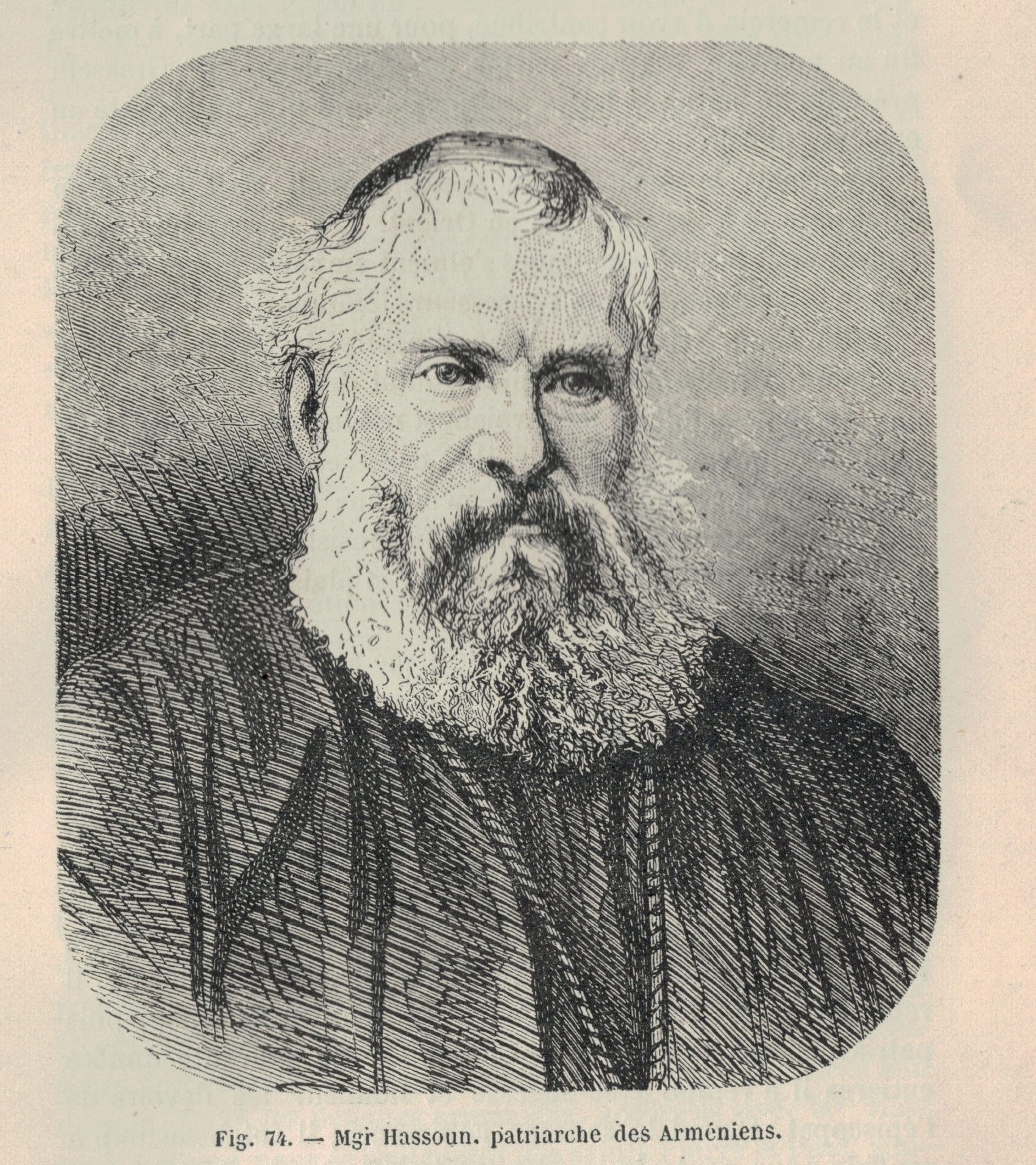
- Church: Armenian Catholic Church
- Appointed: 16 December 1880
- Term ended: 28 February 1884
- Predecessor: Antonmaria Sauli
- Successor: Guglielmo Massaia
- Previous posts: Titular Archbishop of Anazarbus (1842-46); Coadjutor Archbishop of Istanbul of the Armenians (1842-46); Archbishop of Istanbul of the Armenians (1846-66); Patriarch of Cilicia (1867-81)

Orders
- Ordination: 8 September 1832
- Consecration: 19 June 1842 by Giacomo Filippo Fransoni
- Created cardinal: 13 December 1880 by Pope Leo XIII
- Rank: Cardinal-Priest

Personal details
- Born: Anton Bedros Hassoun; 15 June 1809 Constantinople, Ottoman Empire
- Died: February 28, 1884 (aged 74) Rome, Kingdom of Italy
- Buried: Campo Verano
- Education: Pontificio Collegio Urbano de Propaganda Fide

Andon Bedros IX Hassoun (15 June 1809 – 28 February 1884) was an Ottoman prelate of the Armenian Catholic Church, the Armenian rite Catholic Church, who was the Patriarch of Cilicia from 1866 to 1881; he was at the center of a schism that lasted from 1870 to 1879. He was previously archbishop of Constantinople of the Armenian Catholics for twenty years.

In 1880, he became the first cardinal of Armenian descent; he was the first prelate from the Eastern Catholic Churches raised to the College of Cardinals since Cardinal Bessarion in 1439.

Note: His name is variously rendered as Hasoun, or Hasounean, or Hassun; Antoine-Pierre IX Hassoun, Antonio Pietro IX Hassun, Anton Petros IX Hassounian, Anthony Peter Hossoun, or Antonium Hassun.

== Biography ==
Andon Bedros Hassoun was born in Constantinople in the Ottoman Empire on 15 June 1809. He studied in Constantinople and beginning in 1822 in Rome at the Seminary of S. Pietro in Vaticano and the Pontifical Urban College for the Propagation of the Faith, where he earned a doctorate in theology in 1832. He was ordained a priest on 8 September 1832.

He was given responsibility for the Armenian Catholic parish in Smyrna. Later, he was moved to Constantinople where he fulfilled parish assignments. He became chancellor and vicar general of the Armenian Catholic see there, Constantinople of the Armenians.

He was appointed titular archbishop of Anazarbus and coadjutor archbishop of Constantinople of the Armenians on 7 June 1842. The election was made according to a decree of the Congregation for the Propagation of the Faith dated 9 May 1842, which was approved by Pope Gregory XVI on 23 May 1842. He received his episcopal consecration on 19 June 1842 from Cardinal Giacomo Filippo Fransoni. He immediately set about planning for an order of religious women, eventually founded as the Armenian Sisters of the Immaculate Conception in 1847.

He became archbishop of Constantinople of the Armenians upon the death of Archbishop Paolo Marusci (Maruschian) on 2 August 1846. (Note: Despite its name, the see of Constantinople of the Armenians exercised jurisdiction over Armenia, Asia Minor, the Constantinople region, and European Turkey.) Over the next twenty years he transformed his see. He founded a seminary in Constantinople and constructed several churches and schools. He developed better relations with the civil authorities. In 1850 he created six new bishoprics in his province as well as an Armenian bishopric in Persia. Rather than insist on maintaining the purity of Armenian Church practice, he allowed the introduction of Latin-rite practices.

On 14 September 1866, a synod held at the Armenian Catholic monastery at Bzoummar near Beirut elected him to lead the Armenian rite patriarchate of Cilicia of the Armenians based in Lebanon. He chose for his patriarchal name Andon Bedros IX. On 12 July 1867, Pope Pius confirmed his appointment and issued the papal bull known as Reversurus that united the see of Constantinople of the Armenians and the patriarchate of Cilicia to create the Patriarchate of Constantinople. The bull also amended the rules for the election of bishops to remove any role for the clergy and laity.

Hossoun participated in the First Vatican Council (1869-1870) where he was member of the commission on dogma and supported the definition of papal infallibility. While he was in Rome, dissension within the Armenian Catholic community reached a breaking point. A synod convened at Constantinople in July 1869 failed to take steps to appease the critics of changes in church organization and election procedures, and on 3 April 1870, with support from the Turkish government, formed a separate church. The schism provoked disputes over the ownership of churches, schools and welfare institutions.

Pope Pius IX excommunicated the schismatics on 14 June 1872 and the responded by expelling Hossoun in July and he took refuge in Rome. Under pressure from France, the Turkish Sultan agreed in 1874 to recognize both churches, one loyal to Rome and one not, which allowed Hossoun to return to Constantinople in 1876. The schismatics reconciled with the Holy See on 18 April 1879, and in 1880 Hossoun was brought to Rome.

Pope Leo XIII raised Hossoun to the rank of cardinal priest on 13 December 1880; he received his red galero and was assigned title of Santi Vitale, Gervasio e Protasio on 16 December 1880. He was the first prelate of Oriental rite created cardinal since the promotion of Cardinal Bessarion in 1439.

He resigned as patriarch in June 1881. He died of pleuropneumonia on 28 February 1884 in his residence in Rome.

There is a memorial in the right side of the chapel of Saint Gregory the Illuminator, in the Armenian church of San Nicola da Tolentino agli Orti Sallustiani in Rome; his cardinalitial hat hangs from the ceiling of that church.
