= Anazarbus (West Syriac diocese) =

Syriac Orthodox Church diocese in Turkey

The city of Anazarbus was an archdiocese of the Syriac Orthodox Church, attested between the sixth and twelfth centuries. Nearly thirty Syriac Orthodox bishops or metropolitans of Anazarbus are mentioned either by Michael the Syrian or in other Syriac Orthodox narrative sources. The archdiocese is last mentioned towards the end of the twelfth century, and seems to have lapsed in the early decades of the thirteenth century.

== Sources ==
The main primary source for the Syriac Orthodox metropolitans of Anazarbus is the record of episcopal consecrations appended to Volume III of the Chronicle of the Syriac Orthodox patriarch Michael the Syrian (1166–99). In this Appendix Michael listed most of the bishops consecrated by the Syriac Orthodox patriarchs of Antioch between the ninth and twelfth centuries. Twenty-eight Syriac Orthodox patriarchs sat during this period, and in many cases Michael was able to list the names of the bishops consecrated during their reigns, their monasteries of origin, and the place where they were consecrated. For the sixth and seventh centuries, Michael's lists are supplemented by several references in other Syriac Orthodox narrative sources.

== Location ==
Anazarbus was a large city of Cilicia, which lay on the river Pyramus or Gihon, 24 miles away from Sis. The city was the metropolis of the Chalcedonian ecclesiastical province of Cilicia Secunda. It was an obvious site for a Syriac Orthodox diocese, and was the seat of a Syriac Orthodox bishop or metropolitan as early as the sixth century. It is one of the oldest attested Jacobite dioceses.

== Bishops and metropolitans of Anazarbus ==
=== Sixth- and seventh-century bishops ===
The Jacobite diocese of Anazarbus is attested between the sixth and twelfth centuries. The earliest known Jacobite bishop of Anazarbus, Yohannan (Iwanis), consecrated the patriarch Sargis of Tella (538–40).

Two seventh-century Jacobite bishops of Anazarbus are known: Stephen (680/1) and Isidore (692).

=== Eighth- to twelfth-century bishops ===
Twenty-five Syriac Orthodox metropolitans of Anazarbus from the end of the eighth century to the end of the twelfth century are mentioned in the lists of Michael the Syrian.

Name	From	Consecrated in the reign of	Place of consecration
Ignatius	Monastery of Natfa	Quriaqos (793–817)	not known
Anastasius	Monastery of Qarqafta	Dionysius I of Tel Mahre (818–45)	not known
Mikha'il	Monastery of Mar Yaʿqob of Cyrrhus	Dionysius I of Tel Mahre (818–45)	not known
Giwargis	Monastery of Sandalaya	Dionysius I of Tel Mahre (818–45)	not known
Severus	Monastery of Mar Zakkai, Callinicus	Dionysius I of Tel Mahre (818–45)	not known
Ahron	Monastery of Mar Zakkai, Callinicus	Yohannan III (847–74)	not known
Abraham	Monastery of Hadbshabba	Ignatius II (878–83)	not known
Quriaqos	Monastery of Shlemun	Ignatius II (878–83)	not known
Cyril	Monastery of Zuqnin	Theodosius Romanus (887–35)	not known
Habib	Monastery of Mar Sargis	Theodosius Romanus (887–95)	not known
Ignatius	Village of Bala	Basil I (923–35)	not known
Yohannan	not known	Yohannan V (936–53)	not known
David	not known	Yohannan V (936–53)	not known
Athanasius	not known	Yohannan V (936–53)	not known
Laʿzar	not known	Dionysius III (958–61)	not known
Thomas	Monastery of Masharʿa	Athanasius IV Laʿzar (987–1003)	Monastery of Barid
Basil	Monastery of Abu'l Hauri	Yohannan VII bar ʿAbdon (1004–30)	not known
Iwanis	Monastery of Buqa	Dionysius IV Heheh (1032–42)	Monastery of Buqa
Basil	Monastery of Abu'l Hauri	Yohannan bar ʿAbdon (1042–57)	not known
Basil	Monastery of Mar Abhai	Basil II (1074–5)	not known
Ishoʿ	Monastery of Abu'l Hauri	Dionysius VI (1088–90)	not known
Shemʿon	Not known	Athanasius VI bar Khamara (1091–1129)	Kaishum
Basil	Not known	Athanasius VI bar Khamara (1091–1129)	Not known
Athanasius Zakkai	Monastery of Mar Bar Sawma, Melitene	Yohannan X Maudiana (1129–37)	not known
Athanasius	not known	Michael I (1166–99)	not known

Further details of some of these bishops are supplied in the narrative sections of the Chronicle of Michael the Syrian and in the Chronicon Ecclesiasticum of Bar Hebraeus:

- The metropolitan Habib (887/895) consecrated the patriarch Basil I at Rusafa in 923.
- The metropolitan Laʿzar (958/961) consecrated the patriarch Athanasius IV (987–1003), in the village of Qatini in the Gihon region.
- The metropolitan Athanasius (1129/1137), the uncle of the patriarch Michael I, must have been consecrated c.1133, as in 1166 he had been bishop of Anazarbus for 'more than 33 years'. In the same year Michael I consecrated three bishops at Antioch, one of whom was Athanasius (1166/1199), who replaced him.

The archdiocese of Anazarbus is not mentioned in any later source, and probably lapsed in the early decades of the thirteenth century, perhaps on the death of Athanasius (1166/1199).
