= Armenian Sisters of the Immaculate Conception =

- Անարատ Յղութեան Հայ Քոյրերու Միաբանութիւն
- Abbreviation: S.A.I.C.
- Formation: 5 June 1847
- Founder: Andon Bedros IX Hassoun and Serpuhi Hadji-Andonian
- Founded at: Constantinople, Ottoman Empire
- Type: Women's religious institute of the Armenian Catholic Church
- Headquarters: Via Vincenzo Monti 9, Rome, Italy
- Superior general: Sister Arousiag Sajonian

The Armenian Sisters of the Immaculate Conception (Armenian: Անարատ Յղութեան Հայ Քոյրերու Միաբանութիւն; Italian: Congregazione delle Suore Armene dell'Immacolata Concezione; abbreviated S.A.I.C.) are a women's religious congregation of the Armenian Catholic Church. Established on 5 June 1847 in Constantinople, in the Ottoman Empire, the congregation was founded by Archbishop Andon Bedros IX Hassoun and Serpuhi Hadji-Andonian. Its principal mission is the education of children and young people, particularly within Armenian communities, alongside religious instruction and charitable work.

The congregation received papal approval on 11 June 1932 and has its motherhouse and general administration in Rome.

== History ==
=== Foundation and early development ===
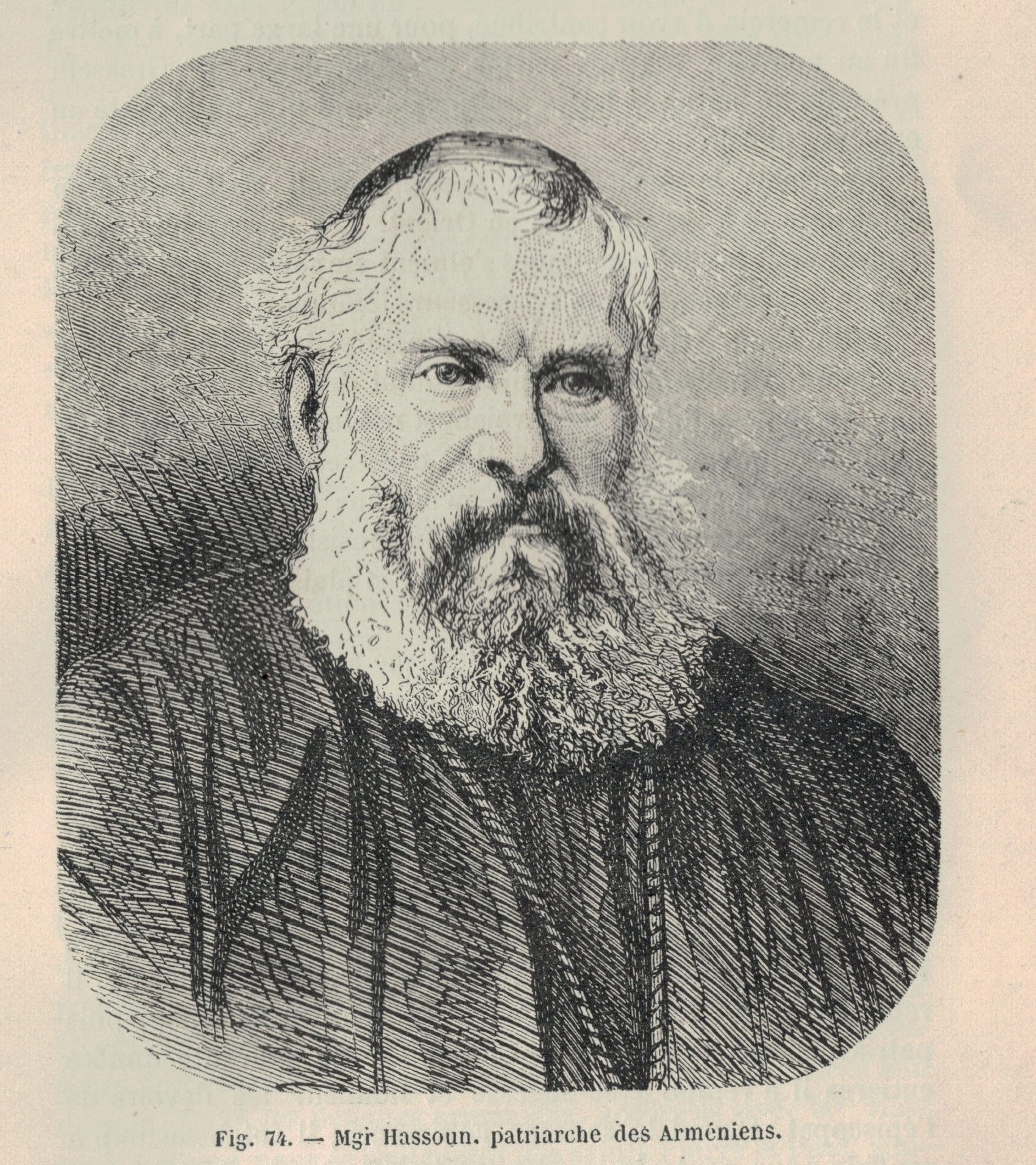
Andon Bedros IX Hassoun (1809–1884), co-founder of the congregation

The establishment of the congregation was initiated by Andon Bedros IX Hassoun (1809–1884), then the Armenian Catholic Archbishop of Constantinople and subsequently Catholicos-Patriarch of Cilicia and the first cardinal of Armenian descent. Hassoun sought to establish a community of religious women dedicated to the education of Armenian girls, particularly those from impoverished families. His plans were developed in cooperation with Serpuhi Hadji-Andonian, who had already undertaken charitable and educational work.

Hadji-Andonian's educational activities began on 5 June 1843, when she provided shelter and instruction for twelve poor Armenian girls in Constantinople. This initiative preceded the formal establishment of the congregation by four years.

The congregation was formally established by a patriarchal decree dated 5 June 1847. On 9 December of that year, Hadji-Andonian and four other women professed vows of poverty, chastity and obedience, together with a commitment to apostolic work. Hadji-Andonian became the first superior of the community.

The sisters initially lived in a modest wooden house. A motherhouse and novitiate were subsequently established in the Pera district of Constantinople. The congregation opened kindergartens, primary schools and institutions providing higher levels of education, combining general instruction with religious education and the teaching of Armenian language and culture. Its work later extended to more than twenty towns and villages in Western Armenia and Cilicia.

=== Armenian genocide and reorganisation ===
The Armenian genocide severely disrupted the congregation's activities. During the persecutions and deportations beginning in 1915, many of its convents and schools were destroyed. Thirteen sisters were killed. The Armenian Catholic Church's historical account records a further 55 sisters deported, whereas a 1997 account by Sister J. Arousiag Sajonian gives the number deported as approximately forty.

In the aftermath of the genocide, surviving sisters became involved in caring for Armenian orphans and refugees. The congregation rebuilt its educational activities in communities where survivors of the genocide had settled, particularly in the Armenian diaspora of the Middle East.

In 1922, Pope Pius XI received sisters caring for approximately 480 orphaned girls at Castel Gandolfo, according to the Enciclopedia Cattolica. The congregation's own historical account dates the transfer of its motherhouse and novitiate from Constantinople to Rome to 1923. Its generalate was subsequently established at Via Vincenzo Monti 9 in Rome's Monteverde district.

On 11 June 1932, the congregation received papal approval. Its constitutions also received definitive approval during that year.

== Organisation ==
The congregation is governed by a superior general, elected by the general chapter for a six-year term and assisted by four councillors. Its motherhouse and novitiate are located in Rome.

Sister Arousiag Sajonian, known for her educational and charitable work in Armenia, serves as superior general. She was identified in this capacity in an October 2026 report on a commemorative event in Armenia.

The size and geographical distribution of the congregation have changed over time. The Enciclopedia Cattolica, published in 1953, reported approximately 150 sisters in 28 houses, including communities in Italy, Turkey, Egypt, Lebanon, Syria, Iran and Iraq. These figures describe its mid-twentieth-century organisation rather than its present membership.

== Activities ==
Education has remained the congregation's principal field of activity. Its schools combine general education with the teaching of Armenian language, history and cultural traditions, as well as religious instruction. The sisters have also operated orphanages, childcare institutions and social-service programmes among Armenian communities in the Middle East, Europe, North America and Armenia.

=== Middle East ===
Following the Armenian genocide, the congregation expanded its work among refugee communities in the Middle East. In 1922, five sisters arrived in Beirut, Lebanon, where they began caring for children who had survived the genocide and established the Collège Saintes Hripsimiantz. The school opened with 64 pupils and expanded in subsequent years. In 1975, it moved to new premises in Fanar, in the Beirut metropolitan area.

The congregation also established educational and charitable institutions in other Middle Eastern countries, including Syria, Egypt, Jordan, Iraq and Iran. These activities developed in response to the geographical dispersal of Armenian communities during the twentieth century.

=== United States ===
Former Armenian Sisters Academy premises in Lexington, Massachusetts, photographed in 2012

The sisters began establishing schools for Armenian-American communities during the 1960s. In 1963, Sisters Hripsime Tcheftelian, Arousiag Sajonian and Valentine arrived in the United States to prepare for the creation of an Armenian school in the Philadelphia area.

The Armenian Sisters Academy opened in southwest Philadelphia in 1967 with sixteen pupils. It later relocated to Radnor, Pennsylvania. Alongside general education, the school teaches Armenian language, history and culture.

The congregation subsequently established schools in the Boston and Los Angeles areas. The Armenian Sisters' Academy in Montrose, California, founded in 1985, provides preschool and elementary and middle-school education. The academy formerly operated in Lexington, Massachusetts, has closed; the congregation's remaining American schools are located in the Philadelphia and Los Angeles areas.

=== Armenia ===
Our Lady of Armenia educational and social-service centre in Gyumri, 2026

The congregation began its work in Armenia following the 1988 Armenian earthquake. In September 1990, Sister Arousiag Sajonian travelled to Spitak, near the earthquake's epicentre, to assist children, teachers and families affected by the disaster. The sisters subsequently developed educational, religious and charitable activities in northern Armenia.

In 1992, the congregation established a convent in Arevik, from which the sisters undertook religious instruction and pastoral activities in neighbouring villages. In 1993, they moved to Gyumri, while continuing their work in the surrounding communities.

Beginning in 1994, the sisters organised summer camps for children who had been orphaned or otherwise affected by the earthquake and regional conflicts. In 1998, the Our Lady of Armenia Boghossian Educational Center opened in Gyumri to provide educational and social support for children in need. A vocational school was completed at the centre in 2009, followed by the establishment of a day-care centre for older people in 2010.

In 2015, the congregation inaugurated the Annie Bezikian Youth Center in Yerevan, extending its educational and social programmes for young people.

Following the 2023 Azerbaijani offensive in Nagorno-Karabakh and the subsequent displacement of the region's Armenian population, the sisters provided accommodation, food and other assistance to refugee families in Gyumri and Tashir. Their work with displaced families was documented by the Catholic Near East Welfare Association in February 2024.
