= Cathedral of Saint Elias and Saint Gregory the Illuminator =

Coordinates: 33.89294°N 35.50758°E

- Սուրբ Եղիա – Սուրբ Գրիգոր Լուսաւորիչ եկեղեցի
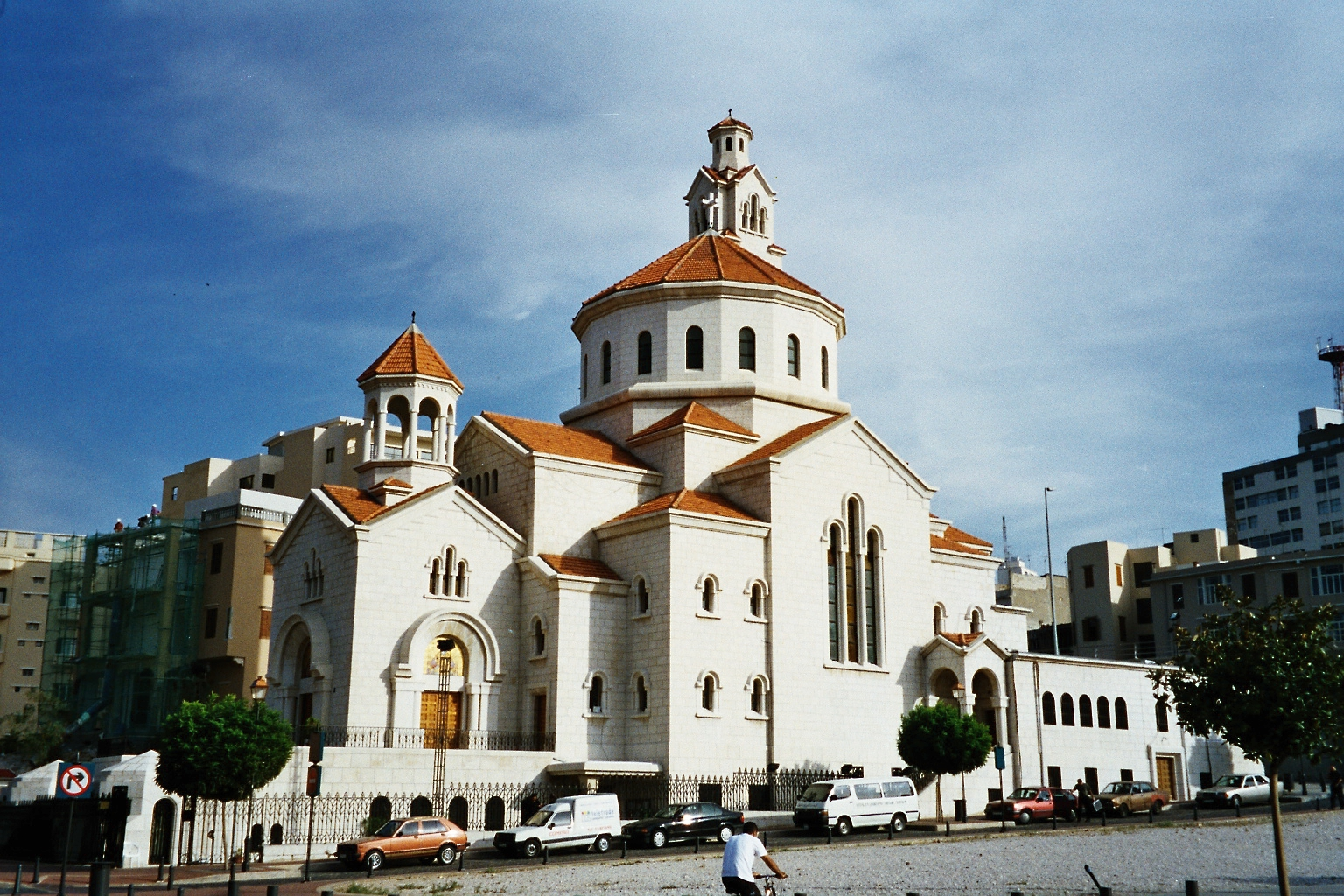
- Cathedral of Saint Elias and Saint Gregory the Illuminator
- Location: Debbas Square; Beirut
- Country: Lebanon
- Denomination: Catholic (Armenian Catholic Church)
- Tradition: Armenian Rite

History
- Dedication: Saint Elias; Gregory the Illuminator

Architecture
- Architect: Pascal Paboudjian

Administration
- Diocese: Armenian Catholic Patriarchate of Cilicia

The Cathedral of Saint Elias and Saint Gregory the Illuminator (Armenian: Սուրբ Եղիա – Սուրբ Գրիգոր Լուսաւորիչ եկեղեցի) is a cathedral of the Armenian Catholic Church in Debbas Square in downtown Beirut, Lebanon. Construction was funded in 1928 by Pope Pius XI. It is the cathedral of the Armenian Catholic Patriarchate of Cilicia. The order in which the two eponymous saints are presented in the cathedral's name, Saint Elias and Saint Gregory the Illuminator, is not fixed.

The architecture of the cathedral reflects some changes from traditional Armenian architecture, drawing artistic inspiration from Rome.

== Gallery ==
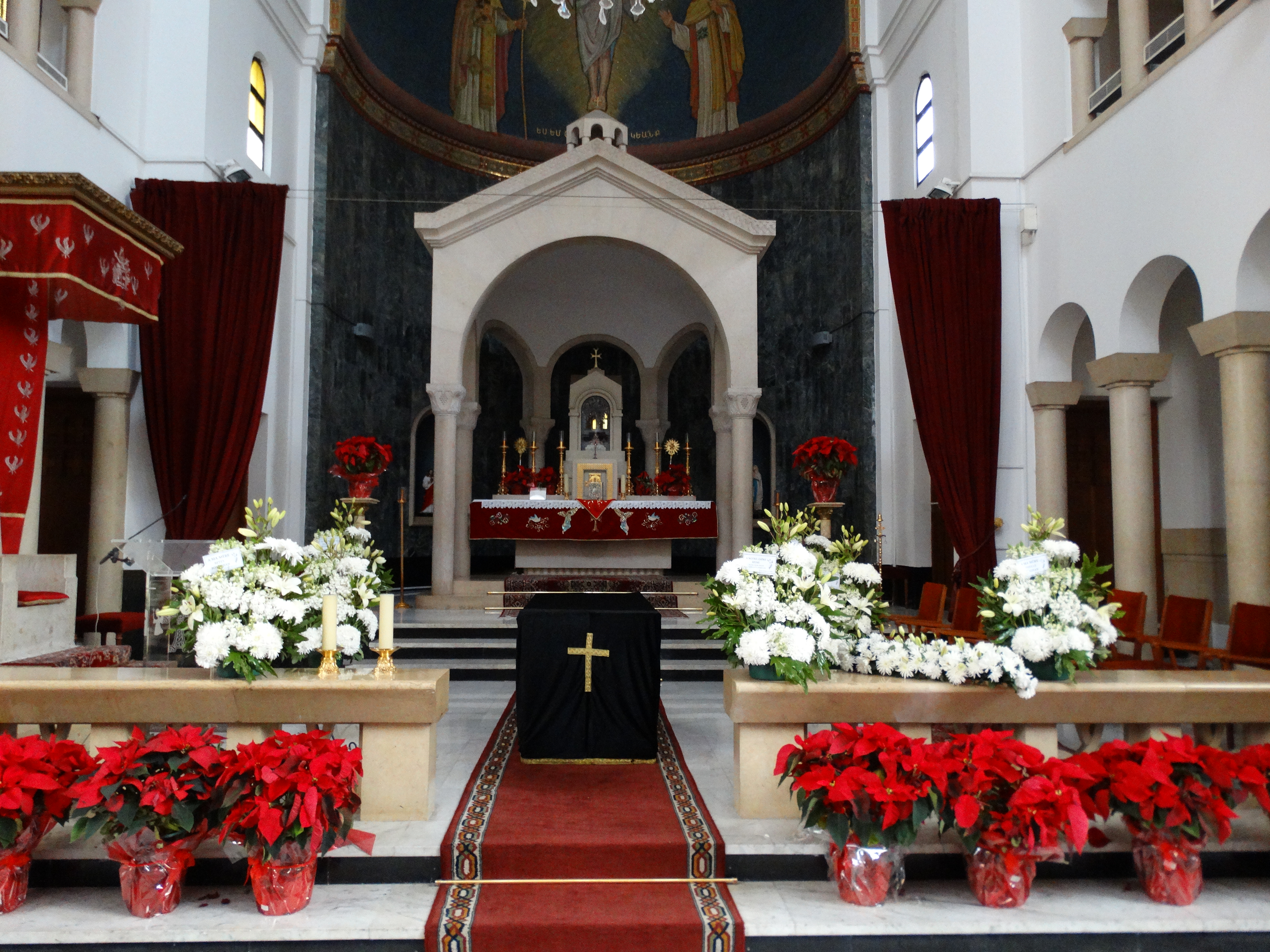
Interior

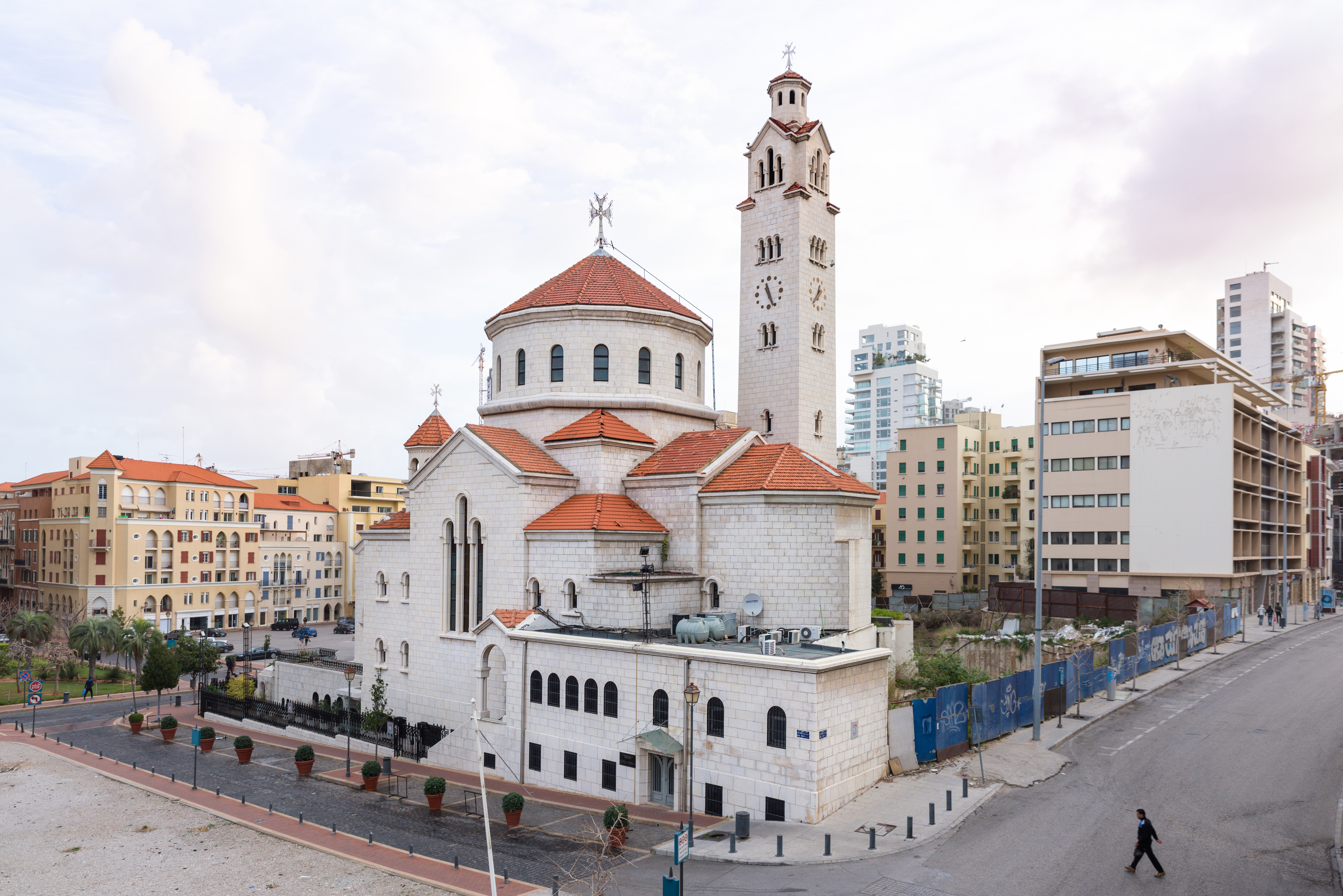
Exterior

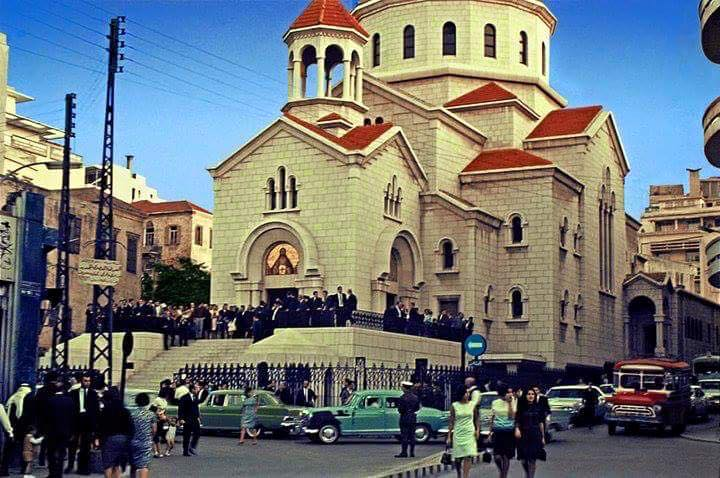
The church in the 1960s

== See also ==
- Architecture of Lebanon
