= Jacob Petros II Hovsepian =

Head of the Armenian Catholic Church from 1749 to 1753

His Beatitude Jacob Petros II Hovsepian
- Founder of the Bzommar convent
- Native name: Յակոբ Պետրոս Բ. Յովսէփեան
- Church: Armenian Catholic Church
- Archdiocese: Cilicia
- See: Cilicia
- Predecessor: Abraham Petros I Ardzivian
- Successor: Michael Petros III Kasparian

Orders
- Ordination: 1720 by Abraham Petros I Ardzivian

Hagop (or Jacob) Petros II Hovsepian (in Armenian Յակոբ Պետրոս Բ. Յովսէփեան ) born in Aleppo, Syria, was Armenian Catholic patriarch of Cilicia.

After living a religious life in St. Antoine's convent at Kadicha for ten years, he returned to his birthplace and Mgr. Ardzivian of Aleppo ordained him priest in 1720.

In 1722, because of many pursuits, bishop Ardzivian was exiled, priest Hagop with some friends bought their needs and with the remaining money, they bought the farm of Kreim (Lebanon) to build an Armenian convent there, and with the other part, they liberated the bishop Abraham from Rouad Island and brought him to Kreim.

In 1735, when he returned to Aleppo as a vicar, the priest Hagop succeeded to get a church through the Pasha and to return Ardzivian to Aleppo (1739). Arriving to Aleppo, Ardzivian ordained bishop the priest Hagop and two other priests and they, in their turn, consecrated him patriarch on November 26, 1740.

Staying in his eparchy of Aleppo for a while, bishop Hagop was obliged to take refuge in Kreim, near to Ardzivian. After serving Ardzivian as his assistant for 35 years, his successor was designated after his death, on October 14, 1740.

He spared the short period of patriarchate of four years to build the convent of Bzommar and to transfer the Patriarchate Seat from Kreim to there in 1749, as ordered the founder patriarch, who, during his lifetime, undertook the construction of the convent.

Hagop II became, with Abraham Ardzivian, the founder of both St. Antoine's order and convent of Kreim.

== See also ==
- List of Armenian Catholic Patriarchs of Cilicia

Preceded by Abraham Petros I Ardzivian	Patriarch Catholicos of Cilicia; 1749–1753	Succeeded by Michael Petros III Kasparian
