= Basile Petros IV Avkadian =

Head of the Armenian Catholic Church from 1780 to 1788

Styles of Basile Petros IV Avkadian
- Reference style: His Beatitude
- Spoken style: Your Beatitude
- Religious style: Catholicos
- Posthumous style: Not Applicable

Basile Petros IV Avkadian (in Armenian Բարսեղ Պետրոս Դ. Աւգատեան ) was an Armenian Catholic Patriarch from Aleppo, Syria from 1780 until 1788. It was said of him that "[H]e never took off his monachal garment when he was bishop and Catholicos".

== See also ==
- List of Armenian Catholic Patriarchs of Cilicia

Preceded by Michael Petros III Kasbarian	Patriarch Catholicos of Cilicia; 1780–1788	Succeeded by Gregory Petros V Kupelian
