= List of Armenian Catholic patriarchs of Cilicia =

This is a list of Catholicos Patriarchs of Cilicia of Armenian Catholics. The Armenian Catholic Patriarchate of Cilicia was established in 1740, following a schism within the Armenian Patriarchate based in Cilicia; it was recognized by Cardinals meeting in Rome on 26 November 1742 and endorsed by Pope Benedict XIV on 8 December the same year. The Catholicos-Patriarch is the head of the Armenian Catholic Church, one of the Eastern Catholic Churches in full communion with the Holy See and therefore part of the broader Catholic Church.

== Armenian Catholic catholicos patriarchs of Cilicia ==
Names in parentheses are in the Armenian language using classical Armenian spelling.

- Abraham Petros I Ardzivian (1740–1749) (Աբրահամ Պետրոս Ա. Արծիւեան)
- Hagop Petros II Hovsepian (1749–1753) (Յակոբ Պետրոս Բ. Յովսէփեան)
- Michael Petros III Kasparian (1753–1780) (Միքայէլ Պետրոս Գ. Գասպարեան)
- Parsegh Petros IV Avkadian (1780–1788) (Բարսեղ Պետրոս Դ. Աւգատեան)
- Gregory Petros V Kupelian (1788–1812) (Գրիգոր Պետրոս Ե. Քիւբելեան)
- Gregory Petros VI Djeranian (1815–1841) (Գրիգոր Պետրոս Զ. Ճերանեան)
- Jacob Petros VII Holassian (1841–1843) (Յակոբ Պետրոս Է. Հոլասեան)
- Gregory Petros VIII Derasdvazadourian (1844–1866) (Գրիգոր Պետրոս Ը. Տէր Աստուածատուրեան)
- Anthony Petros IX Hassun (1866–1881) (ԱՆտոն Պետրոս Թ. Հասունեան)
  - Jacob Pahtiarian (anti-patriarch) c. (1871–) (Յակոբ հակաթոռ)
- Stephen Petros X Azarian (1881–1899) (Ստեփանոս Պետրոս Ժ. Ազարեան)
- Paul Petros XI Emmanuelian (1899–1904) (Պօղոս Պետրոս ԺԱ Էմմանուէլեան)
- Paul Petros XII Sabbaghian (1904–1910) (Պօղոս Պետրոս ԺԲ. Սապպաղեան)
- Paul Petros XIII Terzian (1910–1931) (Պօղոս Պետրոս ԺԳ. Թերզեան)
- Avedis Petros XIV Arpiarian (1931–1937) (Աւետիս Պետրոս ԺԴ. Արփիարեան)
- Gregory Petros XV Agagianian (1937–1962) (Գրիգոր Պետրոս ԺԵ. Աղաճանեան)
- Ignatius Petros XVI Batanian (1962–1976) (Իգնատիոս Պետրոս ԺԶ Պաթանեան)
- Hemaiag Petros XVII Ghedighian (1976–1982) (Հմայեակ Պետրոս ԺԷ. Կետիկեան)
- John Petros XVIII Kasparian (1982–1999) (Յովաննէս Պետրոս ԺԸ. Գասպարեան)
- Nerses Petros XIX Tarmouni (1999–2015) (Ներսէս Պետրոս ԺԹ. Թարմունի)
- Krikor Petros XX Gabroyan (2015–2021) (Գրիգոր Պետրոս Ի. Կապրոյեան)
- Raphaël Bedros XXI Minassian (since 2021) (Ռաֆայել Պետրոս ԻԱ. Մինասեան)

== See also ==
- List of Armenian catholicoi of Cilicia
- List of Catholicoi of Armenia
- Armenian Patriarchs of Constantinople
- Armenian Patriarchs of Jerusalem
