= Abraham Petros I Ardzivian =

Head of the Armenian Catholic Church from 1740 to 1749

His Beatitude Abraham Petros I Ardzivian Աբրահամ Պետրոս Ա Արծիւեան
- Founder of the Armenian Catholic Church and first Catholicos-Patriarch of the church
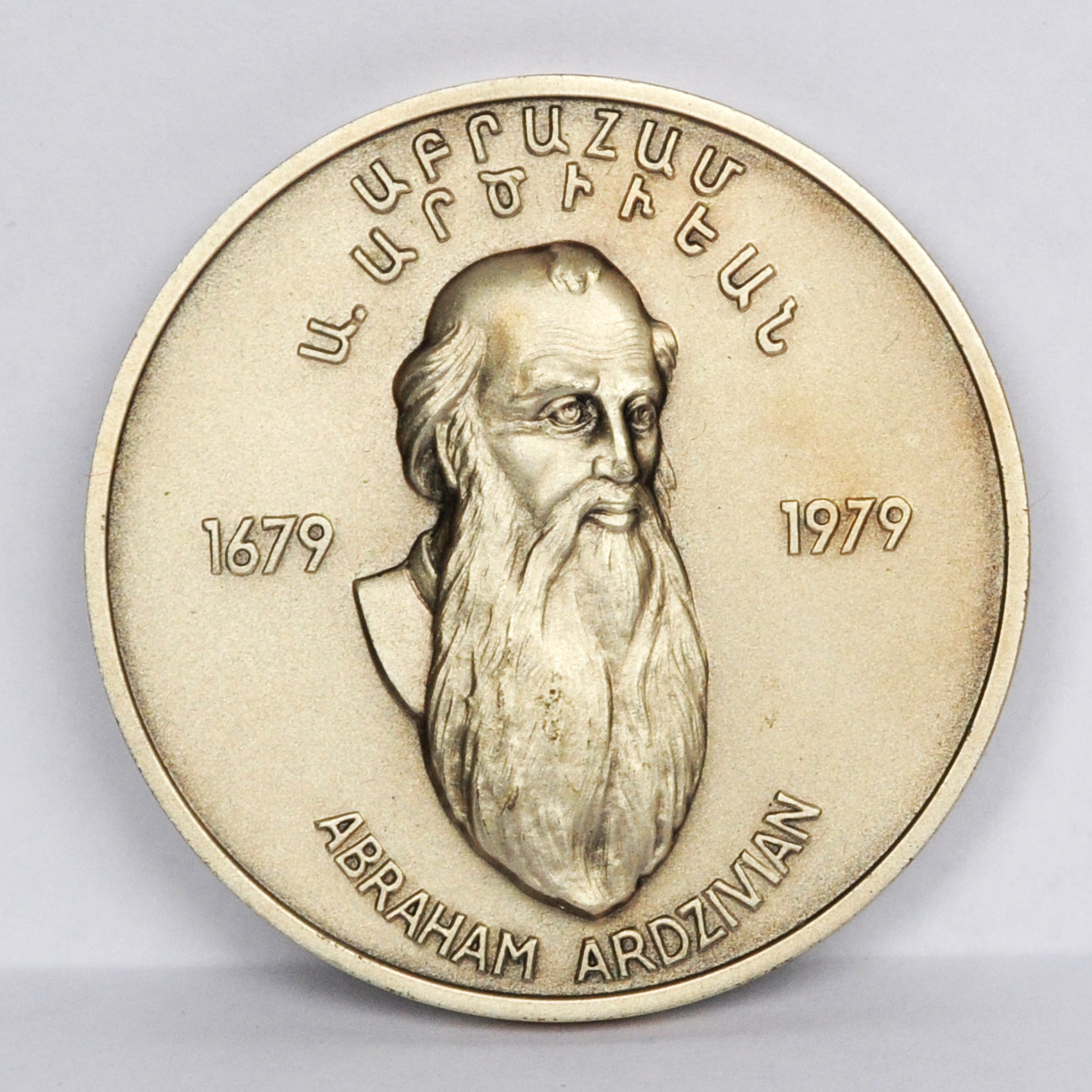
- Church: Armenian Catholic Church
- Archdiocese: Cilicia
- See: Cilicia
- Elected: 26 November 1740
- Successor: Hagop Petros II Hovsepian

Orders
- Ordination: 1706
- Consecration: 1710

Personal details
- Born: 12 April 1679 Aintab, Ottoman Empire
- Died: 1 October 1749

Abraham Petros I Ardzivian (Armenian: Աբրահամ Պետրոս Ա. Արծիւեան; 1679 in Aintab, Ottoman Empire – 1749 in Lebanon) was the founder of the Armenian Catholic Church and its first Catholicos-Patriarch from 1740 to 1749.

== Biography ==
He was born on 12 April 1679 in Aintab and started his religious vocation as a priest in 1706 in the Armenian Apostolic Church. In 1710 Ardzivian was ordained as the Armenian Orthodox Bishop of Aleppo by the Catholicos of the Holy See of Cilicia (the Armenian Catholicosate of the Great House of Cilicia).

After his conversion to Catholicism, he was persecuted, imprisoned and exiled, in different Ottoman prisons. In 1714, many Armenian converts to Catholicism decided to congregate independently under the leadership of Bishops Melkon Tazbazian and Abraham Ardzivian, with both being in prison. Tazbazian died in prison and Ardzivian, being liberated briefly was imprisoned again on Rouad Island from 1719 to 1721. After liberation and residing briefly in Aleppo, he took refuge in voluntary exile in Lebanon at Kreim, near Ghosta, Keserwan, Lebanon.

The Armenian Catholic Mouradian brothers of Aleppo bought an estate to found an Armenian Catholic convent in Kreim where Ardzivian resided. He founded the Kreim convent and St-Antoine's Armenian Catholic Monks order. After two decades in Lebanon, he returned to his eparchy of Aleppo in 1739 after one year of the establishment of the eparchy in 1738.

He was enthroned Armenian Catholic Bishop of Aleppo by Greek Catholic bishops in 1739 and was declared the first Catholicos-Patriarch of the Armenian Catholic Church on November 26, 1740. This was ratified by Pope Benedict XIV after a meeting of the Cardinals in Rome on November 26, 1742. The Pope also granted him the Pallium.

Upon his return, to Lebanon, he served as Catholicos-Patriarch aided by 6 clergy and a number of Armenian Catholic monks. He died on 1 October 1749. He was succeeded by Hagop Petros II Hovsepian.

== See also ==
- List of Armenian Catholic Patriarchs of Cilicia

== Sources ==
- Gabriella Uluhogian: Abraham Petros Ardzivian, primo patriarca armeno-cattolico. In: Studi e Ricerche sull'Oriente Cristiano 6,1 (1983) 3-17.

Catholic Church titles
Preceded by Ghougas I of Cilicia	Patriarch Catholicos of Cilicia; 1740–1749	Succeeded by Jacob Petros II Hovsepian
