= Michael Petros III Kasparian =

Head of the Armenian Catholic Church from 1753 to 1780

Styles of Michael Petros III Kasbarian
- Reference style: His Beatitude
- Spoken style: Your Beatitude
- Religious style: Catholicos
- Posthumous style: Not Applicable

Michael Petros III Kasbarian (in Armenian Միքայէլ Պետրոս Գ. Գասպարեան ) was a member of the Order of St. Antoine, from Aleppo, Syria.

During his time at Bzommar there was not a church. All the big events took place at the Monastery of the Holy Savior, Kreim, Ghosta, Lebanon. He limited all outside activities, focusing on the seat and its responsibilities. He began construction on the monk's church at Bzommar in 1761 completing it in 1771. He worked diligently on expanding the convent at Bzommar, becoming the largest construction area on the mountain.

Michael Petros III found the need for missionaries to carry the message to neighboring countries. Missionaries that served the patriarch were not typically members of the St. Antoine Order as the Order desired to raise up those who would become patriarchs rather than teach missionaries.

== See also ==
- List of Armenian Catholic Patriarchs of Cilicia

Preceded by Hagop Petros II Hovsepian	Patriarch Catholicos of Cilicia; 1753–1780	Succeeded by Basile Petros IV Avkadian
