= Patriarchate of Cilicia =

Eastern Catholic patriarchate in Lebanon

Coordinates: 33.9850°N 35.6844°E

Catholic
- Coat of arms
- Incumbent: Raphaël Bedros XXI Minassian elected 23 September 2021

Location
- Headquarters: Beirut

Information
- First holder: Abraham Petros I Ardzivian (Independent)
- Denomination: Eastern Catholic
- Sui iuris church: Armenian Catholic Church
- Rite: Armenian Rite
- Established: 1742
- Cathedral: Cathedral of St Elias and St Gregory the Illuminator

Website
- www.armeniancatholic.org/

The Patriarchate of Cilicia (Latin: Patriarchatus Ciliciæ Armenorum) is an ecclesiastical jurisdiction and the only patriarchate of the Armenian Catholic Church of the Catholic Church. The territorial jurisdiction of the Patriarch of Cilicia is the Archeparchy of Beirut, over which the Patriarch of Cilicia holds ordinary authority. The St. Elie and St. Gregory the Illuminator Armenian Catholic Cathedral in Beirut, Lebanon, is the cathedra of the Patriarchate. The Patriarchate is headed by Patriarch Raphaël Bedros XXI Minassian elected in September 2021.

== History ==
While the diocese of Cilicia dates back to 294, it was promoted to a patriarchate in 1742. In 1866, the seat of the patriarchate was moved to Constantinople, Ottoman Empire (now Istanbul, Turkey), and in 1928 to Beirut, Lebanon, where it remains today.

== Ordinaries ==
=== Patriarchs ===
- Abraham Petros I Ardzivian (1740–1749)
- Hagop Petros II Hovsepian (1749–1753)
- Michael Petros III Kasparian (1753–1780)
- Parsegh Petros IV Avkadian (1780–1788)
- Gregory Petros V Kupelian (1788–1812)
- Gregory Petros VI Djeranian (1815–1841)
- Jacob Petros VII Holassian (1841–1843)
- Gregory Petros VIII Derasdvazadourian (1844–1866)
- Anthony Petros IX Hassun (1866–1881), elevated to cardinal in 1880
- Stephen Petros X Azarian (1881–1899)
- Paul Petros XI Emmanuelian (1899–1904)
- Paul Petros XII Sabbaghian (1904–1910)
- Paul Petros XIII Terzian (1910–1931)
- Avedis Petros XIV Arpiarian (1931–1937)
- Gregory Petros XV Agagianian (1937–1962), elevated to cardinal in 1946
- Ignatius Petros XVI Batanian (1962–1976)
- Hemaiag Petros XVII Ghedighian (1976–1982)
- John Petros XVIII Kasparian (1982–1999)
- Nerses Petros XIX Tarmouni (1999–2015)
- Krikor Petros XX Gabroyan (2015–2021)
- Raphaël Bedros XXI Minassian (2021–)

=== Auxiliary bishops ===
- Krikor Badichah (2024–)

== See also ==
- List of Armenian Catholic Patriarchs of Cilicia
- Council of Catholic Patriarchs of the East
- Armenian diaspora
