= Sarkis Davidian =

Syrian-born Armenian Catholic bishop (born 1943)

Most Reverend Sarkis Davidian ICPB
- Bishop of Isfahan
- Native name: Սարգիս Դաւիթեան
- Church: Armenian Catholic Church
- Province: Cilicia
- Installed: 1 October 2015
- Term ended: 9 February 2026
- Predecessor: Nechan Karakéhéyan
- Other post: Apostolic Administrator of Isfahan (since 2026)

Orders
- Ordination: 11 October 1970
- Consecration: 25 November 2015 by Krikor Bedros XX Ghabroyan, Kévork Khazoumian, Jean Teyrouz

Personal details
- Born: Sarkis Davidian; 9 November 1943 (age 82) Aleppo, First Syrian Republic

Sarkis Davidian, ICPB (Armenian: Սարգիս Դաւիթեան; born 9 November 1943) is a Syrian-born Iranian Armenian Catholic hierarch. He served as the Bishop of the Armenian Catholic Eparchy of Isfahan in Iran from 2015 until his retirement in 2026.

== Biography ==
Sarkis Davidian was born in Aleppo, Syria, on 9 November 1943. He entered the Patriarchal Congregation of Bzommar and completed his theological and philosophical studies in Rome at the Pontifical Armenian College. He was ordained to the priesthood on 11 October 1970.

During his priestly ministry, Davidian served in various pastoral roles, including as parish priest in several Armenian Catholic communities. He also served as the Superior of the Bzommar Monastery and held administrative responsibilities within the institute. Also he served 17 years as the parish priest for the Armenian Catholic faithful in Marseille, France.

On 1 October 2015, Pope Francis confirmed his election by the Synod of Bishops of the Armenian Catholic Church as the Bishop of Isfahan, Iran. He was consecrated as a bishop on 21 November 2015 by Patriarch Krikor Bedros XX Ghabroyan, assisted by Kévork Khazoumian and Jean Teyrouz.

In September 2021, following the death of Patriarch Krikor Bedros XX Ghabroyan, he participated in the Elective Synod of the Armenian Catholic Church convened by Pope Francis at the Pontifical Armenian College in Rome. He was part of the body of bishops that elected Raphaël Bedros XXI Minassian as the new Patriarch of Cilicia.

On 9 February 2026, the Holy See announced that Pope Leo XIV had accepted his resignation from the pastoral government of the Eparchy of Isfahan, because he having reached the age limit, but at the same time, he was appointed the Apostolic Administrator sede vacante of this Eparchy.
