= Parsegh Baghdassarian =

Armenian-Lebanese bishop (born 1975)

His Grace, The Most Reverend Parsegh Baghdassarian
- Auxiliary Eparch of Our Lady of Nareg in the United States and Canada; Titular Bishop of Comana Armeniae
- Archdiocese: Our Lady of Nareg in the United States and Canada
- Appointed: April 3, 2024
- Installed: June 15, 2024
- Other post: Titular bishop of Comana Armeniae

Orders
- Ordination: September 2, 2000 by Nerses Bedros XIX Tarmouni
- Consecration: June 15, 2024 by Raphaël Bedros XXI Minassian, Mikaël Antoine Mouradian, and Jean Teyrouz

Personal details
- Born: February 21, 1975 (age 51) Beirut, Lebanon

Styles of Parsegh Baghdassarian
- Reference style: His Grace; The Most Reverend
- Spoken style: His Grace
- Religious style: Eparch

Parsegh Baghdassarian (born February 21, 1975) is an Armenian-Lebanese prelate of the Catholic Church who serves as an auxiliary eparch for the Eparchy of Our Lady of Nareg in the United States and Canada, a jurisdiction of the Armenian Catholic Church.

== Career ==
Baghdassarian entered the Saint Michael the Archangel Seminary in Bzommar, Lebanon on August 8, 1988, where he studied philosophy and theology. He continued his studies in theology in Rome at the Pontifical Gregorian University where he graduated with the Licentiate of Oriental Canon Law from the Pontifical Oriental Institute. On September 2, 2000, Baghdassarian was ordained to the priesthood for the Institute of the Patriarchal Clergy of Bzommar, an Armenian Catholic religious order. He also obtained a diploma in the Formation of Educators at the Salesian Pontifical University.

Since 2017, he has served as pastor of Saint Gregory the Illuminator Cathedral in Los Angeles.

== Episcopal career ==
Pope Francis appointed Baghdassarian auxiliary eparch for the Eparchy of Our Lady of Nareg on April 3, 2024. On June 15, 2024, Baghdassarian was consecrated as eparch.

== See also ==
- Catholic Church hierarchy
- Catholic Church in the United States
- Historical list of the Catholic bishops of the United States
- List of Catholic bishops of the United States
- Lists of patriarchs, archbishops, and bishops

== Episcopal succession ==
Catholic Church titles
Preceded by -	Auxiliary Eparch of Our Lady of Nareg; 2024–present	Succeeded by -
