= Kévork Khazoumian =

Lebanese-born Armenian Catholic archbishop (born 1935)

Most Reverend Kévork Khazoumian ICPB
- Archbishop Coadjutor Emeritus of Istanbul
- Church: Armenian Catholic Church
- Diocese: Istanbul
- Installed: 15 March 2006
- Term ended: 21 May 2014
- Predecessor: Hovhannes Tcholakian
- Successor: Levon Zekiyan
- Other posts: Titular Bishop of Marash degli Armeni (2002–2006), Patriarchal Exarch of Jerusalem and Amman (2001–2006), Titular Archbishop of Caesarea in Cappadocia degli Armeni (since 2021)

Orders
- Ordination: 3 July 1960
- Consecration: 7 April 2002 by Nerses Bedros XIX Tarmouni

Personal details
- Born: 10 March 1935 (age 91) Chiyah, Greater Lebanon
- Education: Pontifical Gregorian University

Kévork Khazoumian ICPB (born 10 March 1935) is a Lebanese-born Armenian Catholic hierarch, Titular Archbishop of Caesarea in Cappadocia degli Armeni (since 2021), who served as the Coadjutor Archbishop of the Armenian Catholic Archeparchy of Istanbul from 2006 until his retirement in 2014. Previously he served as a Patriarchal Exarch of Jerusalem and Amman for the Armenians (2001–2006).

== Biography ==
Kévork Khazoumian was born in Chiyah, Lebanon, in 1935. He joined the Patriarchal Congregation of Bzommar, obtained a licentiate in Theology from the Pontifical Gregorian University (1954–1960) and was ordained a priest on 3 July 1960 at the St. Gregorios Cathedral in Beirut.

In 2001 he was appointed as a Patriarchal Exarch of Jerusalem and Amman for the Armenians, and on 22 January 2002, he was elected Titular Bishop of Marash degli Armeni. He received his episcopal consecration on 7 April 2002 from Patriarch Nerses Bedros XIX Tarmouni, with Bishops Jean Teyrouz and Vartan Achkarian serving as co-consecrators.

On 15 March 2006, the Synod of Bishops of the Armenian Catholic Church elected him as Coadjutor Archbishop of the Archeparchy of Istanbul. This election was subsequently confirmed by Pope Benedict XVI. He served as coadjutor to Archbishop Hovhannes Tcholakian, but never eventually succeeding to the full governance of the see.

Upon reaching the age of retirement, his resignation was accepted by Pope Francis on 21 May 2014.

In September 2021, following the death of Patriarch Krikor Bedros XX Ghabroyan, he participated in the Elective Synod of the Armenian Catholic Church convened by Pope Francis at the Pontifical Armenian College in Rome. He was part of the body of bishops that elected Raphaël Bedros XXI Minassian as the new Patriarch of Cilicia.

Khazoumian was appointed a Titular Archbishop of Caesarea in Cappadocia degli Armeni on 24 November 2021.
