= Hovhannes Tertsakian =

Most Reverend Hovhannes Tertsakian, C.A.M.
- Apostolic Exarch of the U.S.A. and Canada
- Church: Armenian Catholic Church
- See: Titular Bishop of Trapezus degli Armeni
- Appointed: January 5, 1995
- In office: May 7, 1995 - November 30, 2000
- Predecessor: Mikail Nersès Sétian
- Successor: Manuel Batakian, I.C.P.B.

Orders
- Ordination: September 8, 1948
- Consecration: April 29, 1995 by Jean Pierre XVIII Kasparian

Personal details
- Born: January 3, 1924 Aleppo, Syria
- Died: January 28, 2002 (aged 78)

Hovhannes Tertsakian, C.A.M. (January 3, 1924 – January 28, 2002) was a bishop of the Catholic Church in the United States. He served as the second exarch of the Apostolic Exarchate of United States of America and Canada of the Armenian Catholic Church from 1995 to 2000.

== Biography ==
Born in Aleppo, Syria, Tertsakian was ordained a priest for the Congregazione Mechitarista on September 8, 1948. Prior to becoming a bishop, he served as the Abbot General of the Order of the Mechitarists, and as the rector of St. Ann's Cathedral in New York City. Pope John Paul II named Batakian as the Titular Bishop of Trapezus degli Armeni and the Apostolic Exarch of the United States of America and Canada on January 5, 1995. He was ordained a bishop by Patriarch Jean Pierre XVIII Kasparian of the Armenian Catholic Church on April 29, 1995. The principal co-consecrators were Eparchs Grégoire Ghabroyan, I.C.P.B. of Sainte-Croix-de-Paris and Mikail Nersès Sétian, the Exarch Emeritus of the US and Canada. He was installed in St. Ann's Cathedral on May 7, 1995. Tertsakian served as exarch until his resignation was accepted by Pope John Paul on November 30, 2000. He died at the age of 78 on January 28, 2002.
