= Armenian Catholic Patriarchal Exarchate of Jerusalem and Amman =

Eastern Catholic missionary jurisdiction in the Holy Land and Jordan

Coordinates: 31.7800°N 35.2325°E

Patriarchal Exarchate of Jerusalem and Amman (Armenian)

Location
- Country: Palestine and Jordan

Statistics
- Population: (as of 2015); 500
- Parishes: 2

Information
- Denomination: Armenian Catholic Church
- Rite: Armenian Rite
- Established: 1991
- Cathedral: Church of Our Lady of Sorrows, Jerusalem

Current leadership
- Pope: Leo XIV
- Patriarch: Raphaël Bedros XXI Minassian, I.C.P.B
- Patriarchal Exarch: Narek Naamoyan

The Armenian Catholic Patriarchal Exarchate of Jerusalem and Amman (colloquially Jerusalem of the Armenians) is the missionary pre-diocesan jurisdiction of the Armenian Catholic Church sui iuris (Eastern Catholic, Armenian Rite in Armenian language) in the Holy Land (Palestine/Israel) and (Trans)Jordan.

It is directly dependent on the Armenian Catholic Patriarch of Cilicia, not part of his or any ecclesiastical province.

Its Cathedral episcopal see is a World Heritage Site: the Church of Our Lady of Sorrows, Jerusalem.

== Antecedents ==
Previously the area had the lower status of patriarchal vicariate within the Armenian Catholic Patriarch of Cilicia's proper archdiocese (based in Beirut).

Patriarchal Vicars of Jerusalem

- Monsignor Giovanni Gamasargan (1973 – 1978)
- Father Joseph Chadarevian (1978 – 1986)
- Father Joseph I. Debs (1986 – 1991 see below)

== History ==
- Established on 1 October 1991 as Patriarchal Exarchate of Jerusalem.
- In 1998 demoted as Territory Dependent on the Patriarch of Amman and Jerusalem, under the same Ordinary
- Promoted back in 2001 as Patriarchal Exarchate of Jerusalem and Amman

== Ordinaries ==
(all Armenian Rite)

Patriarchal Exarchs of Jerusalem

- Father Joseph I. Debs (see above 1991 – 1992), previously last Patriarchal Vicar of Jerusalem of the Armenians (1986 – 1991)
- Archimandrite Joseph Rubian (1992 – 1995)
- André Bedoglouyan, Patriarchal Clergy Institute of Bzommar (I.C.P.B.) (1995 – 1998 see below), previously Titular Bishop of Comana Armeniæ (1971.07.24 – death 2010.04.13) & Auxiliary Eparch of Cilicia of the Armenians (patriarchate, in Lebanon) (1971.07.24 – 1994.11.05), also Apostolic Administrator of Kameshli of the Armenians (Syria) (1988 – 1989)

Protosyncellus of (Patriarchal Dependency) Amman and Jerusalem

- André Bedoglouyan, I.C.P.B. (see above 1998 – retired 2001)

Patriarchal Exarchs of Jerusalem and Amman

- Kévork Khazoumian (2001 – 2006.03.15), also Titular Bishop of Marasc of the Armenians (2002.01.22 – 2006.03.15); later Coadjutor Archeparch of Istanbul of the Armenians (Turkey) (2006.03.15 – 2014.05.21)
- Msgr. Raphaël François Minassian (2006 – 2011.06.24); later Titular Archbishop of Cesarea in Cappadocia of the Armenians (2011.06.24 – 2021.09.23), Ordinary of East Europe of the Armenians (Armenia) (2011.06.24 – 2021.09.23) & Catholicos Patriarch of Cilicia of Armenian Catholics as Raphaël Bedros XXI Minassian (2021.09.23 – ...)
- Msgr. Joseph Antoine Kélékian (2011.08.08 – retired 2014)
- Apostolic Administrator Msgr. Kevork Noradounguian, I.C.P.B. (2014.04.30 – 2015.11.25)
- Kricor-Okosdinos Coussa (2015.11.25 – 2019.05.10); previously Eparch of Iskanderiya of the Armenians (Alexandria, Egypt) ([2003.09.09] 2004.01.07 – ...)
- Nerses Zabarian (2019.05.10 – 2022.09.11)
- Narek Naamoyan (2022.09.11 – ...)
