= Elie Yéghiayan =

Syrian-born Armenian Catholic bishop (born 1950)

Most Reverend Elie Yéghia Yéghiayan ICPB
- Bishop of Sainte-Croix-de-Paris
- Church: Armenian Catholic Church
- Diocese: Sainte-Croix-de-Paris
- Installed: 23 June 2018
- Predecessor: Jean Teyrouz
- Other post: Apostolic Visitor for Armenian Catholics in Western Europe (since 2020)

Orders
- Ordination: 24 March 1974 by Hemaiag Bedros XVII Ghedighian
- Consecration: 12 August 2018 by Gregory Peter XX Ghabroyan

Personal details
- Born: Yéghia Yéghiayan; 29 May 1950 (age 76) Aleppo, First Syrian Republic
- Residence: Paris, France
- Education: Pontifical Gregorian University

Elie Yéghia Yéghiayan ICPB (born 29 May 1950) is a Syrian-born Armenian Catholic hierarch, who has served as the Bishop of the Armenian Catholic Eparchy of Sainte-Croix-de-Paris since 2018 and as the Apostolic Visitor for Armenian Catholics in Western Europe since 2020.

== Biography ==
=== Early life and ministry ===
Yéghia Yéghiayan was born on 29 May 1950 in Aleppo, Syria. He began his religious formation at the Armenian Catholic Seminary of the Patriarchal Congregation of Bzommar in Lebanon. He later moved to Rome to pursue higher ecclesiastical studies at the Pontifical Gregorian University, where he earned degrees in philosophy and theology.

He was ordained a priest for the Institute of the Patriarchal Clergy of Bzommar on 24 March 1974 by Patriarch Hemaiag Bedros XVII Ghedighian. Following his ordination, Yéghiayan held a variety of educational and pastoral leadership positions within the Armenian Catholic Church. He served as the vice-rector of the Minor Seminary of Bzommar from 1974 to 1978 and was the pastor of the Church of the Annunciation in Beirut for two years. For over a decade, between 1980 and 1992, he served as the director of the St. Mesrob Armenian Catholic College in Bourj Hammoud, followed by a five-year term as pastor and director in Zalka.

In 1997, Yéghiayan returned to Rome to serve as the Rector of the Pontifical Armenian College until 2001. Upon his return to Lebanon, he was elected as a member of the board of directors and vice-superior of the Bzommar Institute. In addition to his administrative duties, he served as a chaplain for the Armenian Catholic Sisters of the Immaculate Conception and was a member of the liturgical commission and the ecclesiastic tribunal for the Patriarchal Eparchy of Beirut.

=== Episcopal ministry ===
On 23 June 2018, Pope Francis appointed Yéghiayan as the Bishop of the Armenian Catholic Eparchy of Sainte-Croix-de-Paris, succeeding the retiring Jean Teyrouz. He received his episcopal consecration on 12 August 2018 at the Convent of Bzommar from Patriarch Gregory Peter XX Ghabroyan and was formally installed in Paris on 10 November 2018. On 27 June 2020, he was further appointed as the Apostolic Visitor for Armenian Catholic faithful in Western Europe who are not under the jurisdiction of a local Armenian ordinary.

In September 2021, following the death of Patriarch Krikor Bedros XX Ghabroyan, he participated in the Elective Synod of the Armenian Catholic Church convened by Pope Francis at the Pontifical Armenian College in Rome. He was part of the body of bishops that elected Raphaël Bedros XXI Minassian as the new Patriarch of Cilicia.
