= Mikael Bassalé =

Armenian clergyman

Mikael Bassalé, I.C.P.B.
- Ordinary of the Ordinariate for Catholics of Armenian Rite in Greece
- Church: Armenian Catholic Church
- Appointed: 25 January 2025
- Predecessor: Fr. Hovsep Bezazian (Apostolic Administrator)
- Previous post: Apostolic Administrator of Ordinariate for Catholics of Armenian Rite in Eastern Europe (2022–2024)

Orders
- Ordination: 21 December 1997 (Priest) by Jean Pierre XVIII Kasparian

Personal details
- Born: Mikael Bassalé; 16 January 1969 (age 57) Beirut, Lebanon

Mikael Bassalé, I.C.P.B. (Armenian: Միքայէլ Պասալէ`; born 16 January 1969) is a Lebanese-born Armenian Catholic clergyman. He is serving as an Ordinary of the Ordinariate for Catholics of Armenian Rite in Greece since 25 January 2025. Previously he served as an Apostolic Administrator of the Ordinariate for Catholics of Armenian Rite in Eastern Europe from 17 May 2022 until 26 September 2024.

== Life ==
Father Bassalé was born in a diasporan Armenian family in Beirut on 16 January 1969. After completed his primary education in Aleppo, he subsequently joined the Minor Seminary of the Patriarchal Congregation of Bzommar in Aleppo, where studied during 1986−1987, and continued his studies at the Major Bzommarian Seminary in Lebanon, where he made a solemn profession. He was ordained as priest on 21 December 1997, after the postgraduate studies in the Pontifical Gregorian University in Rome, Italy.

After his ordination to priesthood, he served in the different Bzommar institutions in Lebanon, Armenia, Georgia and Russia and in the same time made a pastoral work for the Armenian Catholics. Last years Fr. Bassalé served as a parish priest of the Holy Cross in Belmont, Massachusetts, in the United States of America.

On 17 May 2022 Father Bassalé was appointed by Pope Francis an Apostolic Administrator of the Ordinariate for Catholics of Armenian Rite in Eastern Europe, that remained vacant almost 9 months, when the previous ordinary Raphaël François Minassian was elected as the Catholicos-Patriarch of Cilicia. He ceased to serve as an Apostolic Administrator after appointment of his successor on 26 September 2024. Some months later, on 25 January 2025 he was appointed as an Ordinary of the Ordinariate for Catholics of Armenian Rite in Greece.

Catholic Church titles
Preceded by Raphaël François Minassian	Apostolic Administrator of Ordinariate for Catholics of Armenian Rite in Eastern Europe; 2022–2024	Succeeded by Kevork Noradounguian
Preceded by Hovsep Bezazian (Apostolic Administrator)	Ordinary of the Ordinariate for Catholics of Armenian Rite in Greece; 2025–present	Incumbent
