= Kricor-Okosdinos Coussa =

Syrian-born Armenian Catholic bishop (born 1953)

The Most Reverend Kricor-Okosdinos Coussa
- Bishop of the Armenian Catholic Eparchy of Alexandria
- Church: Armenian Catholic Church
- See: Alexandria of the Armenians
- Appointed: 7 January 2004
- Predecessor: Nerses Tarmouni (as Administrator)
- Other post: Patriarchal Exarch of Jerusalem and Amman (2015–2019)

Orders
- Ordination: 24 December 1980
- Consecration: 9 May 2004 by Nerses Bedros XIX Tarmouni, Paul Coussa, Boutros Marayati

Personal details
- Born: Kricor-Okosdinos Coussa; 17 June 1953 (age 72) Aleppo, Second Syrian Republic
- Residence: Cairo, Egypt

Kricor-Okosdinos Coussa (born 17 June 1953) is a Syrian-born Egyptian Armenian Catholic hierarch, who has served as the Bishop of the Armenian Catholic Eparchy of Alexandria since 2004. His jurisdiction covers Armenian Catholics in Egypt and Sudan. he also served as a Patriarchal Exarch of Jerusalem and Amman (2015–2019).

== Early life and ministry ==
Kricor-Okosdinos Coussa was born in Aleppo, Syria, in 1953. He completed his early studies at the Minor Seminary of Bzommar in Lebanon before moving to Rome, where he attended the Pontifical Armenian College. He was ordained a priest on 24 December 1980 for the Armenian Catholic Archeparchy of Aleppo. Prior to his episcopal appointment, he served as a parish priest in Aleppo, where he was noted for his work within the Armenian community.

== Episcopal ministry ==
On 7 January 2004, Pope John Paul II confirmed his election by the Synod of Bishops of the Armenian Catholic Church as the Bishop of the Eparchy of Alexandria of the Armenians. He was consecrated on 9 May 2004 by Patriarch Nerses Bedros XIX Tarmouni, assisted by Archbishops Paul Coussa and Boutros Marayati.

In October 2010, Coussa participated in the Special Assembly for the Middle East of the Synod of Bishops at the Vatican. During the assembly, he spoke about the historical role of the Armenian people as a "bridge" between the East and the West and emphasized the importance of interreligion dialogue. He also highlighted the challenges of Christian emigration from the Middle East and the legal difficulties regarding personal status laws for Christians in the region.

As Bishop of Alexandria, he oversees a small but historically significant community in Cairo and Alexandria, and he frequently advocates for the preservation of the Armenian language and cultural identity through the church's educational institutions.

Between 25 November 2015 and 10 May 2019, he additionally held the position of Patriarchal Exarch of Jerusalem and Amman, overseeing the Armenian Catholic communities in Palestine, Israel, and Jordan.

In September 2021, following the death of Patriarch Krikor Bedros XX Ghabroyan, he participated in the Elective Synod of the Armenian Catholic Church convened by Pope Francis at the Pontifical Armenian College in Rome. He was part of the body of bishops that elected Raphaël Bedros XXI Minassian as the new Patriarch of Cilicia.
