= Ordinariate for Catholics of Armenian Rite in Greece =

Armenian Catholic ecclesiastical jurisdiction in Greece

Location
- Country: Greece
- Ecclesiastical province: Immediately exempt to the Holy See

Statistics
- Population: (as of 2013); 200
- Parishes: 2

Information
- Denomination: Catholic Church
- Sui iuris church: Latin Church
- Rite: Armenian Rite
- Established: 21 December 1925

Current leadership
- Pope: Leo XIV
- Patriarch: Krikor Bedros XX Gabroyan
- Bishop: Fr. Mikael Bassalé, I.C.P.B.

The Ordinariate for Catholics of Armenian Rite in Greece or Armenian Catholic Ordinariate of Greece (informally Greece of the Armenians ) is an Armenian Catholic Church ecclesiastical territory or ordinariate for the faithful of eastern rite of the Catholic Church for its faithful in Greece.

It is exempt to the Holy See, specifically to the Congregation for the Oriental Churches and is not part of any ecclesiastical province.

== History ==
The ordinariate was established on December 21, 1925, by Pope Pius XI to serve Armenian Catholics who arrived in Greece during the First World War. This Armenian Catholic Ordinariate of Greece was created to the particular church sui iuris had no proper Ordinary.

From 1950 to 2002, the ordinariate, shaped by its diaspora situation, increased from 450 to 550 Armenian Catholic Christians, cared for by the only diocesan priest of the Ordinariate in the only municipality in the country.

Between January 7, 2003, and March 21, 2015, the Armenian bishop of Isfahan (Iran) was the Apostolic Administrator of the Ordinariate.

== Territory and statistics ==
The Ordinariate extends its jurisdiction over the Armenian Catholics of the whole Greece. There are 200 Catholics belonging to this ordinariate.

Its cathedral is the Armenian Church of St. Gregory the Illuminator, in the episcopal see and Greek capital Athens. Another parish is present in Nikaia.

== Ordinaries ==
(all Armenian Rite)

Ordinaries of Greece

- Father Giuseppe Khantzian (1949.06.18 – death 1973)
- Fr. Giovanni Koyounian (1973.06.21 – death 1991)
- Neshan Karakéhéyan, I.C.P.B. (1991 – 2000.09.27 see below), later Eparch (Bishop) of Ispahan of the Armenians (Iran) (2000.09.27 – 2005.04.02), remained Apostolic Administrator of Greece of the Armenians (Greece) (2000.09.27 – 2015.03.21), Ordinary of East Europe of the Armenians (Armenia) (2005.04.02 – 2010.01.06), remaining Patriarchal Administrator of Ispahan of the Armenians (Iran) (2005.04.02 – 2015.10.01), Titular Archbishop of Adana of the Armenians (2005.04.02 – ...)
- Apostolic Administrator Neshan Karakéhéyan, I.C.P.B. (see above 2000.09.27 – 2015.03.21)
- Apostolic Administrator Fr. Hovsep Bezazian (Bezouzou) (2015.03.21 – 2025.01.25), no other office
- Fr. Mikael Bassalé, I.C.P.B. (since 2025.01.25)

== Sources ==
- Annuario Pontificio, Libreria Editrice Vaticana, Città del Vaticano, 2003, ISBN 88-209-7422-3.
