= Mikaël Antoine Mouradian =

His Grace, The Most Reverend Mikaël Antoine Mouradian I.C.P.B.
- Eparch of Our Lady of Nareg in New York
- Church: Armenian Catholic Church
- Diocese: Armenian Catholic Eparchy of Our Lady of Nareg in the United States of America and Canada
- Appointed: May 21, 2011
- Installed: July 31, 2011
- Predecessor: Manuel Batakian, I.C.P.B.

Orders
- Ordination: October 24, 1987 by Krikor Bedros XX Gabroyan, I.C.P.B.
- Consecration: July 31, 2011 by Nerses Bedros XIX Tarmouni, Boutros Marayati, Krikor Bedros XX Gabroyan, Nechan Karakéhéyan and Manuel Batakian

Personal details
- Born: July 5, 1961 (age 65) Beirut, Lebanon

Styles of Mikaël Antoine Mouradian
- Reference style: His Grace; The Most Reverend
- Spoken style: His Grace
- Religious style: Eparch

Mikaël Antoine Mouradian, I.C.P.B. (born July 5, 1961) is an Armenian Catholic hierarch in the United States. He has served as the second eparch (bishop) of the Armenian Catholic Eparchy of Our Lady of Nareg in the United States of America and Canada since 2011.

== Biography ==
Mikaël Mouradian was born in Beirut, Lebanon and ordained a priest for the Patriarchal Congregation of Bzommar on October 24, 1987 by Bishop Grégoire Ghabroyan, I.C.P.B. Pope Benedict XVI named Mouradian as the eparch of Our Lady of Nareg in New York on May 21, 2011. He was ordained a bishop by Patriarch Nerses Bedros XIX Tarmouni of the Armenian Catholic Church on July 31, 2011. The principal co-consecrators were Archeparch Boutros Marayati of Alep, Eparch Grégoire Ghabroyan, I.C.P.B. of Sainte-Croix-de-Paris, Archeparch Nechan Karakéhéyan, I.C.P.B. of Eastern Europe and Eparch Emeritus of New York Manuel Batakian, I.C.P.B.

In September 2021, following the death of Patriarch Krikor Bedros XX Ghabroyan, he participated in the Elective Synod of the Armenian Catholic Church convened by Pope Francis at the Pontifical Armenian College in Rome. He was part of the body of bishops that elected Raphaël Bedros XXI Minassian as the new Patriarch of Cilicia.

== See also ==
- Catholic Church hierarchy
- Catholic Church in the United States
- Historical list of the Catholic bishops of the United States
- List of Catholic bishops of the United States
- Lists of patriarchs, archbishops, and bishops

== Episcopal succession ==
Catholic Church titles
Preceded by Manuel Batakian	Armenian Catholic Eparch of Our Lady of Nareg; 2011-Present	Succeeded by incumbent
