= Kevork Noradounguian =

Armenian Catholic archbishop (born 1968)

His Excellency Kevork Noradounguian ICPB
- Ordinary of Eastern Europe for the Armenians
- Church: Armenian Catholic Church
- Diocese: Ordinariate for Catholics of Armenian Rite in Eastern Europe
- Appointed: 21 August 2024
- Installed: 21 September 2024
- Predecessor: Raphaël Minassian
- Other post: Titular Archbishop of Sebastopolis in Armenia (2024–present)
- Previous post: Apostolic Administrator of the Armenian Catholic Patriarchal Exarchate of Jerusalem and Amman (2014–2015)

Orders
- Ordination: 20 August 1995 by Nerses Bedros XIX Tarmouni
- Consecration: 21 September 2024 by Raphaël Bedros XXI Minassian

Personal details
- Born: Kevork Noradounguian; 16 November 1968 (age 57) Aleppo, Syria
- Residence: Gyumri, Armenia
- Education: Pontifical Gregorian University, Salesian Pontifical University

Kevork Noradounguian ICPB (Armenian: Գևորգ Նորատունկյան; born 16 November 1968) is a Syrian-born Armenian Catholic hierarch, who has served as the Ordinary of the Ordinariate for Catholics of Armenian Rite in Eastern Europe since 21 August 2024. He also holds the title of Titular Archbishop of Sebastopolis in Armenia.

== Biography ==
=== Early life and education ===
Kevork Noradounguian was born on 16 November 1968, in Aleppo, Syria. He entered the Seminary of the Patriarchal Congregation of Bzommar in 1985 and later moved to Rome to continue his studies. He attended the Pontifical Gregorian University, where he studied philosophy and theology, and later earned a licentiate in educational sciences from the Salesian Pontifical University.

=== Priesthood ===
He was ordained a priest on 20 August 1995, as a member of the Patriarchal Congregation of Bzommar. During his priestly ministry, he held several key positions, including: Vice-rector and later Rector of the Bzommar Seminary; Rector of the Pontifical Armenian College in Rome (2007–2010); General Administrator of the Bzommar Congregation (2010–2015); Parish priest of the Armenian Catholic community in Lyon, France (2015–2023).

Also in 2014–2015 he was an Apostolic Administrator ad nutum Sanctæ Sedis of the Armenian Catholic Patriarchal Exarchate of Jerusalem and Amman.

=== Episcopate ===
On 21 August 2024, Pope Francis confirmed his election by the Synod of Bishops of the Armenian Catholic Church as Ordinary of the Ordinariate for Armenian Catholics in Eastern Europe and appointed him Titular Archbishop of Sebastopolis in Armenia.

He received his episcopal consecration on 21 September 2024, at the Cathedral of the Holy Martyrs in Gyumri, Armenia. The principal consecrator was Patriarch Raphaël Bedros XXI Minassian, assisted by other members of the Armenian Catholic hierarchy.
