= Saint Gregory the Illuminator Cathedral =

Saint Gregory the Illuminator Cathedral may refer to:

Armenia

- Saint Gregory the Illuminator Cathedral, Yerevan

Brazil

- St. Gregory the Illuminator Cathedral, São Paulo

Greece

- St. Gregory the Illuminator Cathedral, Athens

Lebanon

- Cathedral of Saint Elias and Saint Gregory the Illuminator

United States

- St. Gregory the Illuminator Cathedral (Glendale, California)
