= Armenian Catholic Eparchy of Sainte-Croix-de-Paris =

Eastern Catholic eparchy in France

Location
- Country: France

Information
- Denomination: Armenian Catholic
- Rite: Armenian
- Established: 30 June 1986
- Cathedral: Cathédrale Sainte-Croix de Paris des Arméniens
- Language: Armenian

Current leadership
- Bishop: Elie Yeghiayan
- Bishops emeritus: Jean Teyrouz, I.C.P.B.

The Armenian Catholic Eparchy of Sainte-Croix-de-Paris (Sainte-Croix-de-Paris of the Armenians, Holy Cross of Paris of the Armenians or France of the Armenians) is an eparchy (Eastern Catholic diocese) for the faithful in France of the Armenian Catholic Church sui iuris, which uses the Armenian Rite in Armenian, in full communion with the universal Pope of Rome.

It is immediately subject to the Armenian Catholic Patriarch of Cilicia (not part of any ecclesiastical province) and depends directly on the Roman Congregation for the Oriental Churches.

It has its Cathedral episcopal see, Cathédrale Sainte-Croix-de-Paris dedicated to the Holy Cross, in Paris, national capital of France.

== History ==
Established on 1960.07.22 as Armenian Catholic Apostolic Vicariate of France, on territory previously not served by the particular church.

Promoted on 1986.06.30 as Eparchy (Diocese) of the Holy Cross of Paris (French Sainte-Croix-de-Paris). Since then, the office of Apostolic Visitor in Western Europe of the Armenian Catholics (for countries without proper Armenian jurisdictions) is vested in the Parisian see.

== Statistics ==
As per 2014, it pastorally served 30,000 Armenian Catholics in 6 parishes with 7 priests (1 diocesan, 6 religious) and 8 lay religious (6 brothers, 2 sisters).

== Episcopal ordinaries ==
Apostolic Vicars of France

- Garabed Amadouni (1960.07.22 – retired 1971), Titular Bishop of Amathus in Cypro (1960.07.22 – death 1984.01.14)
- Grégoire Ghabroyan, Patriarchal Clergy Institute of Bzommar (I.C.P.B.) (1977.01.03 – 1986.06.30 see below), Titular Bishop of Amida of the Armenians (1977.01.03 – 1986.06.30)

Eparchs (Bishops) of Sainte-Croix-de-Paris

- Grégoire Ghabroyan, I.C.P.B. (see above 1986.06.30 – 2013.02.02), Apostolic Visitor in Western Europe of the Armenians (1986.06.30 – 2013.06.08); later Patriarchal Administrator of Cilicia of the Armenians (Lebanon) (2015.06.25 – 2015.07.25), elected Armenian Catholic Patriarch of Cilicia of the Armenians ([2015.07.24] 2015.07.25 – ...), President of Synod of the Armenian Catholic Church (2015.07.25 – ...); born 1934.11.15 in Syria, ordained Priest 1959.03.28, consecrated Bishop 1977.02.13
- Jean Teyrouz, I.C.P.B. (2013.02.02 – ...), Apostolic Visitor in Western Europe of the Armenians (2013.06.08 – ...); previously Titular Bishop of Melitene of the Armenians (2000.09.27 – 2013.02.02) as Bishop of Curia of Cilician patriarchate the Armenians (2000.09.27 – 2013.02.02); born 1941.05.06 in Syria, ordained Priest 1965.12.24, consecrated Bishop 2001.03.25.

== Sources and external links ==
- GCatholic, with Google satellite photo - data for all sections
