= Armenian Catholic Eparchy of Alexandria =

Eastern Catholic eparchy in Egypt and Sudan

Coordinates: 30.0500°N 31.2333°E

Eparchy of Alexandria Eparchia Alexandrina Armenorum
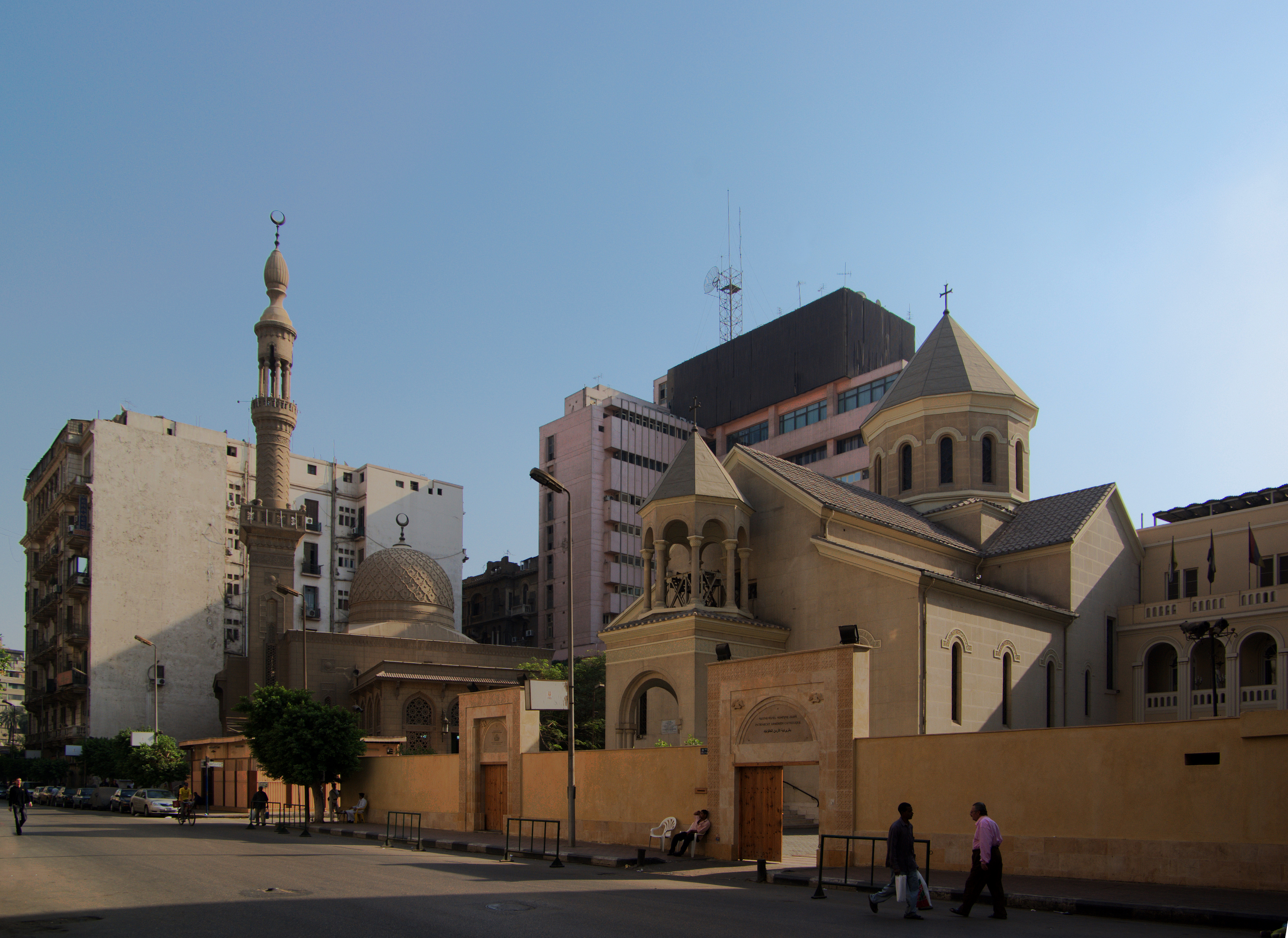
- The Annunciation Cathedral, Cairo

Location
- Country: Egypt
- Metropolitan: Patriarchate of Cilicia
- Headquarters: Cairo, Egypt

Statistics
- Population: (as of 2023); 9,153
- Parishes: 4

Information
- Denomination: Catholic Church
- Sui iuris church: Armenian Catholic Church
- Rite: Armenian Rite
- Established: 1885; 141 years ago
- Cathedral: Annunciation Cathedral, Cairo
- Secular priests: 2 (1 Diocesan, 1 Religious Orders)
- Language: Armenian

Current leadership
- Pope: Leo XIV
- Patriarch: Raphaël Bedros XXI Minassian, I.C.P.B.
- Bishop: Kricor-Okosdinos Coussa

The Armenian Catholic Eparchy of Alexandria (or Iskanderiya) is a suffragan eparchy (Eastern Catholic diocese) of the Armenian Catholic Church sui iuris (Armenian Rite in Armenian language), in the Patriarch's own 'ecclesiastical province of Cilicia' (actually based in Beirut, Lebanon), covering Egypt and Sudan. Its cathedral is the Annunciation Cathedral is in Cairo and not in Alexandria as the title of the eparchy states.

== History ==
Established in 1885 as Eparchy of Iskanderiya / Alexandria, on territory separated for the particular church sui iuris from the Latin Catholic Apostolic Vicariate of Egypt.

== Leadership ==
=== Eparchs of Alexandria (or Iskanderiya) ===
- Paul Acderian (1849 – 15 April 1866)
- Barnabé Akscheislian (13 April 1886 – 16 May 1898)
- Boghos Bedros XII. Sabbaghian (15 November 1901 – 4 August 1904), elected Patriarch of Cilicia
- Pietro Kojunian (8 March 1907 – 14 March 1911), resigned
- Jean Couzian, I.C.P.B. (1 October 1911 – 6 May 1933)
- Jacques Nessimian (5 August 1933 – 2 July 1960)
- Raphaël Bayan, I.C.P.B. (2 July 1960 – 9 March 1989), retired
- Boutros Taza Tarmouni (21 August 1989 – 7 October 1999), elected Patriarch of Cilicia
- Kricor-Okosdinos Coussa (7 January 2004 – Present)

=== Coadjutor Bishop ===
- Raphaël Bayan, I.C.P.B. (1958-1960), succeeded

== List of Churches ==
List of Armenian Catholic churches in Egypt

- Annunciation Cathedral, Cairo
- Church of the Resurrection in the cemetery, Cairo
- Saint Teresa Church, Heliopolis
- Church of the Immaculate Conception, Alexandria

== See also ==
- Catholic Church in Egypt
- List of Catholic dioceses in Egypt
- List of cathedrals in Egypt
