= Armenian Catholic Eparchy of Isfahan =

Eastern Catholic eparchy in Iran

Coordinates: 32.6500°N 51.6667°E

Eparchy of Isfahan Eparchia Hispahanensis Armenorum Սպահանի թեմ
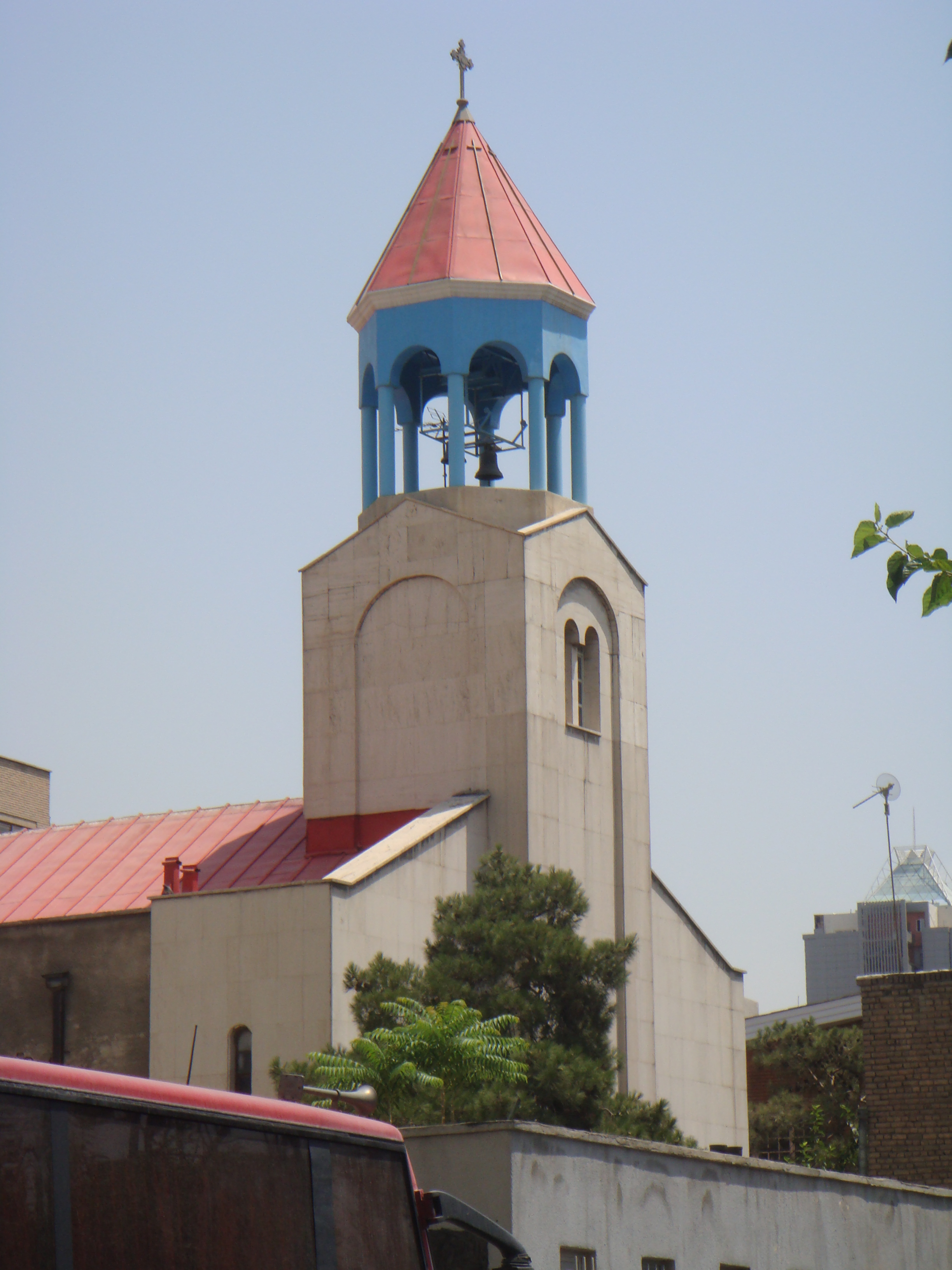

Location
- Country: Iran
- Territory: Patriarchate of Cilicia
- Headquarters: Tehran, Iran

Statistics
- Population: (as of 2023); 150
- Parishes: 1

Information
- Denomination: Catholic Church
- Sui iuris church: Armenian Catholic Church
- Rite: Armenian Rite
- Established: 30 April 1850; 176 years ago
- Cathedral: Saint Gregory the Illuminator Armenian Catholic Church in Tehran
- Patron saint: Gregory the Illuminator
- Language: Armenian

Current leadership
- Pope: Leo XIV
- Patriarch: Raphaël Bedros XXI Minassian, I.C.P.B.
- Eparch: Sede vacante
- Apostolic Administrator: Sarkis Davidian, I.C.P.B.
- Bishops emeritus: Sarkis Davidian, I.C.P.B.

The Armenian Catholic Eparchy of Isfahan (or Ispahan or Esfahan) is a suffragan eparchy (Eastern Catholic diocese), covering all of Iran, in the ecclesiastical province 'of Cilicia' of the Armenian Catholic Patriarch, the head of the Armenian Catholic Church (Armenian Rite in the Armenian language).

Saint Gregory the Illuminator Armenian Catholic Church is the only functioning place of worship and at the same time the cathedral of the eparchy, whose seat, despite its name, is located in Tehran .

== History ==
- 30 April 1850: Established as Eparchy of Isfahan, on territory previously without Ordinary for the particular church sui iurus

== Leadership ==
(all Armenian Rite)

=== Eparchs of Isfahan ===
- Joannes Derderian (30 April 1850 – 1852)
  - Apostolic Administrator Pierre Tilkian (28 June 1853 – 17 September 1858), Priest
- Joannes Zadighian (5 April 1859 – 22 April 1860), resigned
- Gregoriius Dabanly (26 April 1861 – unknown)
- Hovhannes Baptist Apcar (24 September 1954 – 9 June 1967)
- Léonce Tchantayan (29 August 1967 – 16 January 1972), resigned
- Vartan Tekeyan, I.C.P.B. (6 December 1972 – 12 April 1999)
- Nechan Karakéhéyan, I.C.P.B. (27 September 2000 – 2 April 2005), appointed Ordinary for Catholics of Armenian Rite in Eastern Europe
- Sarkis Davidian, I.C.P.B. (1 October 2015 – 9 February 2026), resigned
  - Apostolic Administrator Sarkis Davidian, I.C.P.B. (9 February 2026 – Present), Eparch emeritus of Isfahan

== See also ==
- Catholic Church in Iran
