= Mikail Nersès Sétian =

Most Reverend Mikail Nersès Sétian
- Apostolic Exarch of the U.S.A. and Canada
- Church: Armenian Catholic Church
- See: Titular Bishop of Ancyra degli Armeni
- Appointed: July 3, 1981
- In office: December 27, 1981 - September 18, 1993
- Successor: Hovhannes Tertsakian, C.A.M.

Orders
- Ordination: April 13, 1941
- Consecration: December 5, 1981 by Hemaiag Bedros XVII Ghedighian, C.A.M.

Personal details
- Born: November 18, 1918 Sivas, Turkey
- Died: September 9, 2002 (aged 83) Los Angeles, California, USA

Mikail Nersès Sétian (November 18, 1918 - September 9, 2002) was a bishop of the Catholic Church in the United States. He served as the first exarch of the Apostolic Exarchate of United States of America and Canada of the Armenian Catholic Church from 1981 to 1993.

== Biography ==
Born in Sivas, Turkey, Sétian was ordained a priest on April 13, 1941. Prior to becoming a bishop, he served as the rector of the Pontifical Armenian College in Rome. Pope John Paul II named Sétian as the Titular Bishop of Ancyra degli Armeni and the Apostolic Exarch of the United States of America and Canada on July 3, 1981. He was ordained a bishop by Patriarch Hemaiag Bedros XVII Ghedighian, C.A.M. of the Armenian Catholic Church on December 5, 1981 in the Cathedral Basilica of Saints Peter and Paul in Philadelphia. The principal co-consecrators were Eparchs Paul Coussa, Auxiliary Bishop of Antioch, and André Bedoglouyan, Auxiliary Bishop of Cilicia. He was installed on December 27, 1981. The exarchate was transferred to New York City with a Pontifical Mass celebrated on Christmas Eve in 1983. Cardinal Terence Cooke of the Roman Catholic Archdiocese of New York offered St. Ann's Shrine in Manhattan for use by the Armenian Church, and it became St. Ann’s Cathedral. Sétian served as exarch until his resignation was accepted by Pope John Paul II on September 18, 1993. He died in Los Angeles, California on September 9, 2002 at the age of 83.
