= St. Mary of Sakızağaç Cathedral =

- Sakızağaç Kutsal Meryem Ana Katedralı, Surp Asdvadzadzin
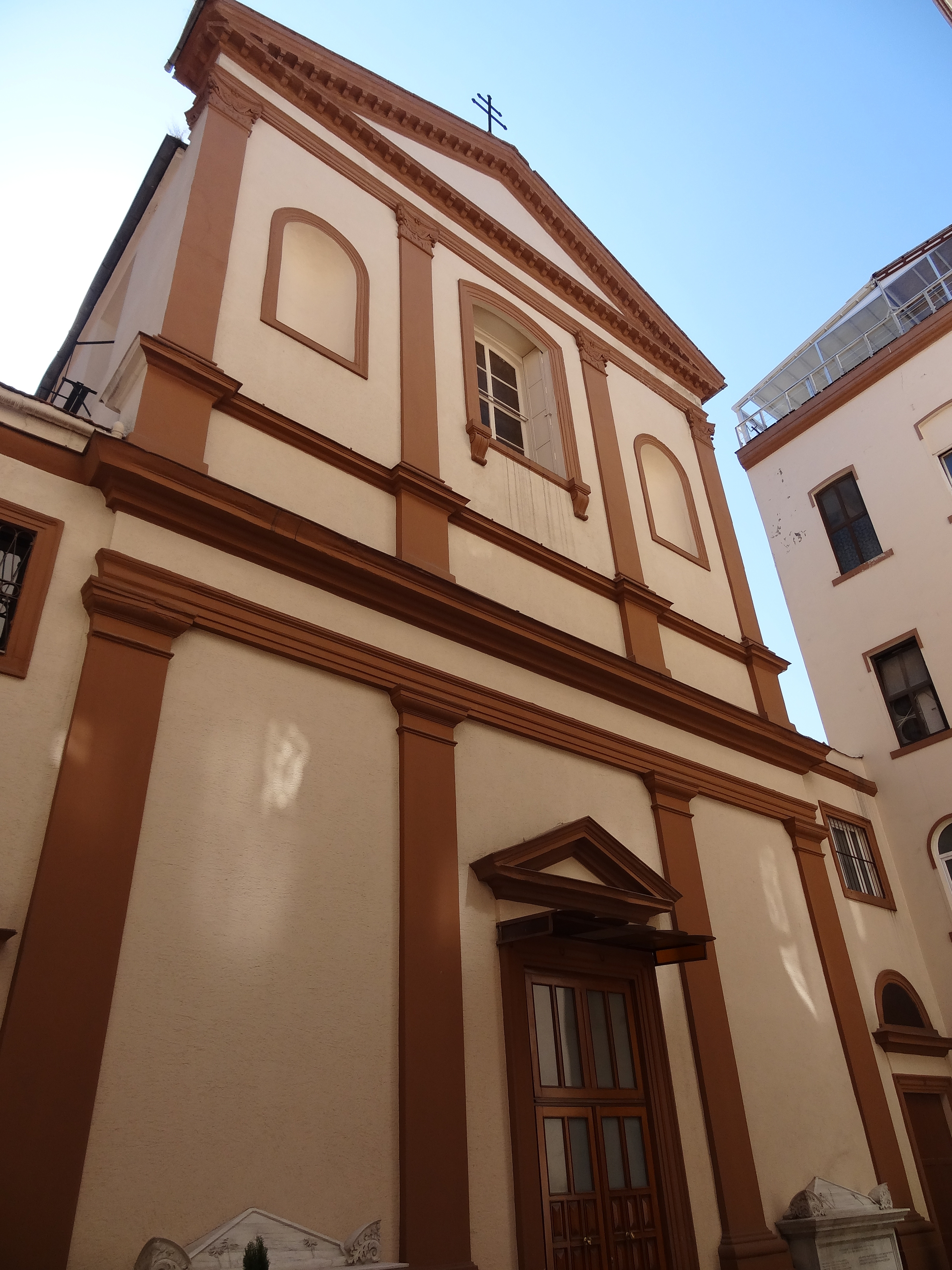
- St. Mary of Sakızağaç Cathedral
- 41.044619°N 29.005113°E
- Location: Beşiktaş, Istanbul
- Country: Turkey
- Denomination: Catholic Church (Armenian rite)

The St. Mary of Sakızağaç Cathedral (Turkish: Sakızağaç Kutsal Meryem Ana Katedralı) also called Surp Asdvadzadzin, or the Armenian Catholic Cathedral of Istanbul is a cathedral belonging to the Armenian Catholic Church, which follows the Armenian rite and is in full communion with the Pope. It is located in Istanbul, the largest city in the Eurasian country of Turkey. It is not to be confused With the other two Catholic cathedrals in that same locality, the Cathedral of the Holy Spirit (Saint Esprit Kilisesi), which follows the Latin Rite, and the cathedral of the Greek Catholic rite (Ayatriada Rum Katoliki Kilise).

It is the main church of the Armenian Catholic Archeparchy of Istanbul (Archieparchia Constantinopolitana Armenorum), which was created in 1830 by the papal bull "Quod jamdiu" from Pope Pius VIII.

It is under the pastoral responsibility of Archbishop Boghos Lévon Zékiyan.

== See also ==
- Catholicism in Turkey
- St. Mary's Cathedral

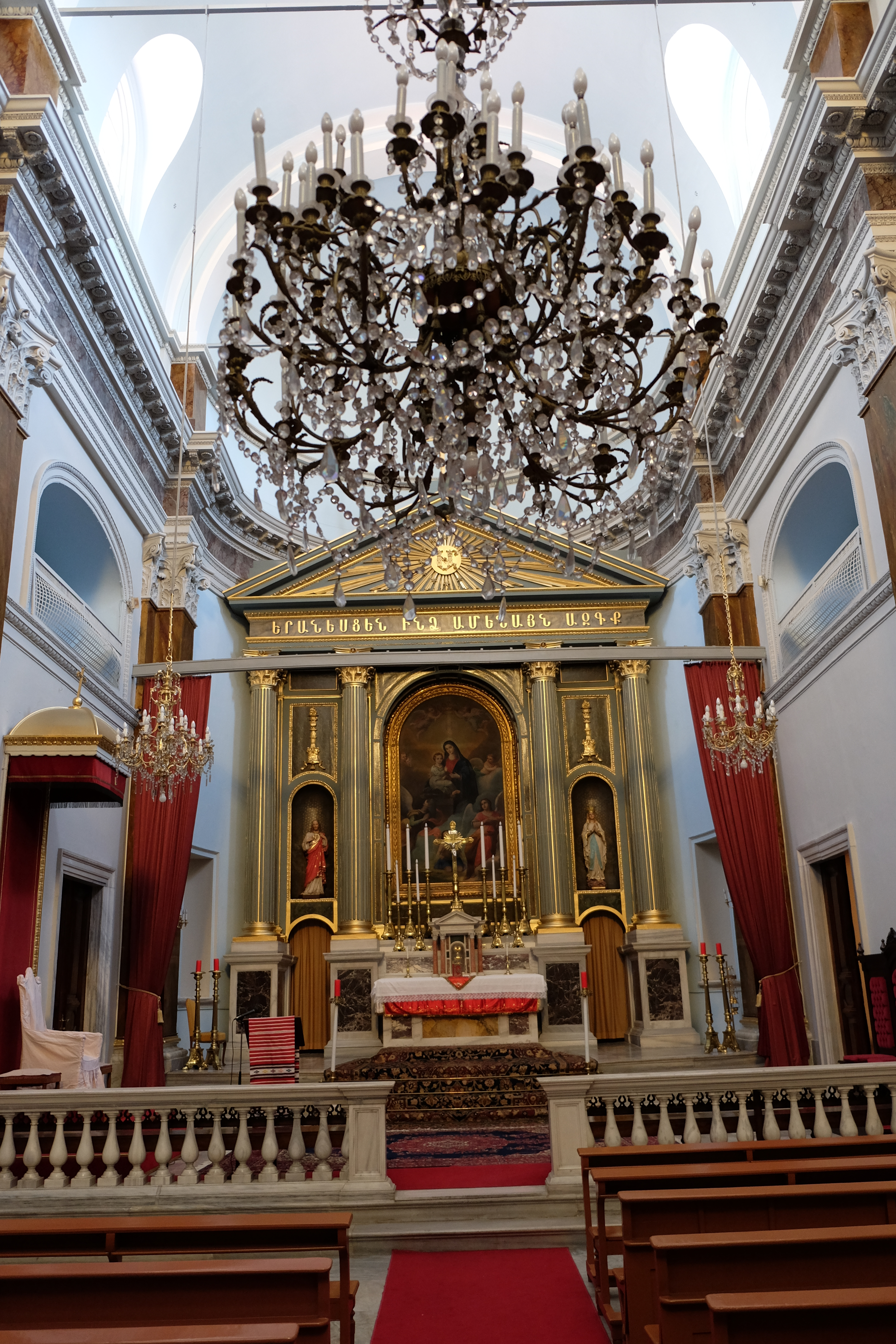
Internal view
