= Manuel Batakian =

Armenian Catholic bishop (1929–2021)

His Grace, The Most Reverend Manuel Batakian, I.C.P.B.
- Eparch Emeritus of Our Lady of Nareg in New York
- Church: Armenian Catholic Church
- Appointed: September 12, 2005
- Term ended: May 21, 2011
- Predecessor: First Eparch
- Successor: Mikaël Mouradian, I.C.P.B.
- Previous posts: Auxiliary Eparch of Cilicia; Titular Bishop of Caesarea in Cappadocia degli Armeni; Apostolic Exarch of the United States and Canada

Orders
- Ordination: December 8, 1954 by Hovhannes Bedros XVIII Kasparian
- Consecration: March 12, 1995 by Hovhannes Bedros XVIII Kasparian, Krikor Bedros XX Gabroyan and André Bedoglouyan

Personal details
- Born: November 5, 1929 Athens, Greece
- Died: October 18, 2021 (aged 91) Beirut, Lebanon

Styles of Manuel Batakian I.C.P.B.
- Reference style: His Grace; The Most Reverend
- Spoken style: His Grace
- Religious style: Eparch

Manuel Batakian, I.C.P.B. (November 5, 1929 – October 18, 2021) was a Greek-born Armenian Catholic hierarch, who served as an auxiliary bishop to the Armenian Catholic Patriarch from 1995 to 2000, as the third exarch of the Apostolic Exarchate of United States of America and Canada from 2000 to 2005, and as the first eparch (bishop) of Armenian Catholic Eparchy of Our Lady of Nareg in New York from 2005 to 2011.

== Biography ==
Born in Athens, Greece, Batakian was ordained a priest for the Patriarchal Congregation of Bzommar on December 8, 1954. He held various offices as a priest. From 1978 to 1984 Batakian served as the Patriarchal Vicar for the Institute of the Patriarchal Clergy of Bzommar. He then served as the rector of the Armenian Catholic Cathedral in Paris and vicar general of the Eparchy of Sainte-Croix-de-Paris. In 1990 he was named as the rector of the Pontifical Armenian College in Rome.

Pope John Paul II named Batakian as the Titular Bishop of Caesarea in Cappadocia degli Armeni and the Auxiliary Bishop of Cilicia on November 11, 1994. He was ordained a bishop by Patriarch Jean Pierre XVIII Kasparian of the Armenian Catholic Church on March 12, 1995. The principal co-consecrators were Eparchs Grégoire Ghabroyan, I.C.P.B. of Sainte-Croix-de-Paris and André Bedoglouyan, I.C.P.B., the auxiliary of Cilicia. Batakian was named the exarch in the United States of America and Canada by Pope John Paul on November 30, 2000. He became the first eparch of the Eparchy of Our Lady of Nareg in New York when Pope Benedict XVI elevated the North American church to an eparchy, or diocese, on September 12, 2005. He served as eparch in New York until his resignation was accepted by Pope Benedict on May 21, 2011. Batakian died on October 18, 2021.

== See also ==
- Historical list of the Catholic bishops of the United States
- List of Catholic bishops of the United States

== Episcopal succession ==
Catholic Church titles
Preceded by First Eparch	Armenian Catholic Eparch of Our Lady of Nareg; 2005–2011	Succeeded by Mikaël Mouradian, I.C.P.B.
Preceded by Hovhannes Tertsakian, C.A.M.	Apostolic Exarch of United States and Canada; 2000–2005	Succeeded by Elevated to Eparchy
