= Raphaël Bayan =

Raphaël Bayan I.C.P.B.
- Eparch of Alexandria
- Church: Armenian Catholic Church
- Diocese: Eparchy of Alexandria
- In office: 2 July 1960 – 9 March 1989
- Predecessor: Jacques Nessimian
- Successor: Nerses Bedros XIX Tarmouni
- Previous posts: Titular Eparch of Taua (1958-1960); Coadjutor Eparch of Alexandria (1958-1960)

Orders
- Ordination: 1 November 1937
- Consecration: 6 January 1959 by Gregorio Pietro Agagianian

Personal details
- Born: 28 February 1914 Zgharta, Tripoli Sanjak, Vilayet of Beirut, Ottoman Empire
- Died: 21 September 1999 (aged 85)

Monsignor Raphaël Bayan (28 February 1914 – 21 September 1999) was Armenian Catholic Bishop Emeritus of Iskandariya of the Armenians (Egypt).

Born in Zgharta in 1914, he was ordained on 1 November 1937 as a priest. On 12 December 1958, aged 44, he was appointed as Coadjutor Bishop of Iskandariya of the Armenians and Titular Bishop of Taua. On 6 January 1959 he was ordained Titular Bishop of Taua.

On 2 July 1960 he succeeded as Bishop of Iskandariya of the Armenians, in which capacity he ordained, on 15 August 1965 in Cairo, as a priest the future Patriarch, Nerses Bedros XIX.

Bayan retired at the age of 75 on 9 March 1989, and became Bishop Emeritus. He died on 21 September 1999, aged 85 after having been a priest for more than 60 years and a bishop for 40 years.

Catholic Church titles
Preceded by Jacques Nessimian	Armenian Catholic Bishop of Alexandria; 1960–1989	Succeeded by Nerses Tarmouni
