= Levon Zekiyan =

Turkish-born academic (born 1943)

Boghos Lévon Zékiyan
- Archeparch Emeritus of Istanbul
- Native name: Պօղոս-Լեւոն Զէքիեան
- Church: Armenian Catholic Church
- Archdiocese: Archeparchy of Istanbul
- In office: 21 March 2015 – 21 October 2024
- Predecessor: Hovhannes Tcholakian
- Successor: Sede Vacante
- Previous posts: Apostolic Administrator of Istanbul (2014-2015); Titular Archbishop of Amida degli Armeni (2014-2015)

Orders
- Ordination: 21 May 1967 by Garabed Amadouni
- Consecration: 13 September 2014 by Nerses Bedros XIX Tarmouni

Personal details
- Born: 21 October 1943 (age 82) Istanbul, Turkey

Boghos Lévon Zékiyan (Armenian: Պօղոս-Լեւոն Զէքիեան; born 21 October 1943 in Istanbul) is an Armenologist, philosopher, Professor of Armenian Language and Literature at Ca' Foscari University of Venice, Pontifical Oriental Institute of Rome and Istanbul University, a member of the Academy of Venice, Foreign member of Armenian National Academy of Sciences, Corresponding member of the Istituto Veneto di Scienze, Lettere ed Arti (1992). He is the Armenian Catholic Archeparch of Istanbul. Zekiyan is the Founding President of the Associazione "Padus-Araxes", the director of Summer Intensive Course of the Armenian Language and Culture at the University of Venice (since 1986), and former editor of Hye Endanik (1974–82) and Bazmavep (1980-1985) periodicals.

== Biography ==
He graduated from the Mekhitarist Seminary of San Lazzaro degli Armeni (1959) and Pontificia Università Gregoriana, Rome (Master in Philosophy (1962), and in Theology (1966)). He was ordained a priest in 1967.

He completed his PhD dissertation "The Principle of Interiority in St. Augustine's Theory of Knowledge and the self-knowledge of the knowing subject" at the State University of Istanbul in 1973. From 1982 to 1985 he was the Principal of Moorat-Raphael College. He was the Secretary of the Armenian Academy of the Mekhitarist Fathers at San Lazzaro in Venice (1974–81).

His scholarly interests include Armenian studies, particularly literature and philology, history and identity, as well as philosophical and theological issues.

In 2014 Pope Francis appointed Archpriest Levon Zekiyan as apostolic administrator “sede plena” of the archieparchy of Istanbul of the Armenians, Turkey, elevating him to the dignity of Archbishop.

In September 2021, following the death of Patriarch Krikor Bedros XX Ghabroyan, he participated in the Elective Synod of the Armenian Catholic Church convened by Pope Francis at the Pontifical Armenian College in Rome. He was part of the body of bishops that elected Raphaël Bedros XXI Minassian as the new Patriarch of Cilicia.

He knows Armenian (old, modern), Italian, French, English, German, Turkish, Russian and Modern Greek (both elementary), Georgian (initial), Latin, Old Greek, Biblical Hebrew (element.).

== Publications ==
- The first steps of Modern Armenian Theatre and the Movement of Armenian Rebirth in the 18th century, Venice, 1975 (in Armenian).
- An Ecumenical Dialogue in the 12th century. The negotiations between St. Nerses Shnorhali and the Imperial Legate Theorianos in view of the Union of Churches, Venice, 1978 (in Armenian).
- Augustinian interiorism. The ontopsychological structure of the Augustinian interiorism and "memoria sui", Genova, 1980 (in Italian).
- Humanism. Conceptual contents and historic roots, Istanbul, 1981 (in Turkish).
- The Armenian way to modernity. Armenian identity between tradition and innovation, specificity and universality, Venice, 1997 (in English).
- Dialectics between Value and contingency. From cultural phenomenology towards an axiological refunding, Naples, 1998 (in Italian).
- Armenia and the Armenians: Restless «polis» and Spiritual Homeland. The challenge of a Survival, Milano, 2000 (in Italian).
