= Emmanuel Dabbaghian =

Syrian-born Armenian Catholic hierarch (1933–2018)

Emmanuel Dabbaghian, I.C.P.B.
- Archbishop of Armenian Catholic Archeparchy of Baghdad
- Church: Armenian Catholic Church
- Appointed: 26 January 2007
- Term ended: 9 October 2017
- Other post: Synkellos of Ordinariate for Catholics of Armenian Rite in Eastern Europe (2003–2007)

Orders
- Ordination: 25 December 1967 (Priest)
- Consecration: 4 August 2007 (Bishop) by Nerses Bedros XIX Tarmouni

Personal details
- Born: Emmanuel Dabbaghian; 26 December 1933 Aleppo, Mandatory Syria (now Syria)
- Died: 13 September 2018 (aged 84) Beirut, Lebanon

Archbishop Emmanuel Dabbaghian, I.C.P.B. (Armenian: Էմանուել Դաբանագյան; 26 December 1933 – 13 September 2018) was a Syrian-born Armenian Catholic hierarch. He served as an archbishop of Armenian Catholic Archeparchy of Baghdad from 26 January 2007 until his retirement on 9 October 2017.

== Life ==
Archbishop Dabbaghian was born in the Armenian family in diaspora, in Syria. After the school graduation, he subsequently joined the Patriarchal Congregation of Bzommar in Lebanon, where he made a solemn profession. He was ordained as priest on December 25, 1967, after studies in the Pontifical Gregorian University, Italy with a baccalaureate in philosophy and theology.

After his ordination to priesthood, he served in the different Patriarchal Congregation of Bzommar institutions in Syria, Lebanon and Georgia and in the same time made a pastoral work for the Armenian Catholics. Also from 2003 until 2007 he served as a Synkellos of Ordinariate for Catholics of Armenian Rite in Eastern Europe and responsible for the theological studies for the Armenian Catholics in Tbilisi.

On January 26, 2007 Vardapet Dabbaghian was confirmed by Pope Benedict XVI and on August 4, 2007 consecrated to the Episcopate as an archbishop of the vacant Armenian Catholic Archeparchy of Baghdad, Iraq. The principal consecrator was Patriarch Nerses Bedros XIX Tarmouni, the Head of the Armenian Catholic Church.

Archbishop Dabbaghian retired from office, because of reaching the age limit. He died in Beirut on September 13, 2018 at age 84, and was buried in the Monastery of Our Lady of Bzommar, Bzoummar.

Catholic Church titles
Preceded by Fr. Andon Atamian (as Ap. Administrator)	Archbishop of Armenian Catholic Archeparchy of Baghdad; 2007–2017	Succeeded by Fr. Nersès Zabarian (as Ap. Administrator)
