= Armenian Catholic Archeparchy of Baghdad =

Eastern Catholic archeparchy in Iraq

Archeparchy of Baghdad Babylonensis Armenorum Բաղդադի թեմ

Location
- Country: Iraq
- Headquarters: Baghdad, Iraq

Statistics
- Population: (as of 2022); 500
- Parishes: 2

Information
- Denomination: Armenian Catholic Church
- Sui iuris church: Armenian Catholic Church
- Rite: Armenian Rite
- Established: 29 June 1954; 72 years ago
- Cathedral: Cathedral of Our Lady of Nareg
- Secular priests: 2 Diocesan

Current leadership
- Pope: Leo XIV
- Patriarch: Raphaël Bedros XXI Minassian, I.C.P.B.
- Archeparch: Nerses Zabarian

The Armenian Catholic Archeparchy of Baghdad is a non-metropolitan Archeparchy (Eastern Catholic archdiocese) of the Armenian Catholic Church, covering Iraq. It is directly dependent on the Armenian Catholic Patriarch of Cilicia, but not part of his Metropolitan ecclesiastical province.

Its cathedral episcopal see is the Cathedral of Our Lady of Nareg, in the Iraqi national capital Baghdad, after which the archeparchy is colloquially known as Baghdad of the Armenians.

Manuscripts related to this church have been digitized by the Hill Museum & Manuscript Library (HMML) in partnership with Centre Numérique des Manuscrits Orientaux (CNMO).

== History ==
The Archeparchy was established on 29 June 1954, on territory split off from the (now titular) Armenian Catholic Archeparchy of Mardin (which simultaneously lost territory to establish the Eparchy of Kameshli (Al-Qamishli, in Syria), and was itself suppressed in 1972), whose Eparch was transferred to the Baghdad daughter see.

== Episcopal ordinaries ==
Non-Metropolitan Archeparchs (Archbishops) of Baghdad of the Armenians

- Nersès Tayroyan (29 June 1954 – 1 October 1972), retired
- Hovhannes Bedros XVIII Kasparian, I.C.P.B. (6 December 1972 – 5 August 1982), elected Patriarch of Cilicia of the Armenians
- Paul Coussa (27 June 1983 – 13 October 2001), retired
- Emmanuel Dabbaghian, I.C.P.B. (26 January 2007 – 9 October 2017), retired
  - Administrator Nerses Zabarian (27 September 2016 – 23 June 2018 see below), priest of Aleppo
  - Apostolic Administrator Nerses Zabarian (see above 23 June 2018 – 27 May 2023 see below), Patriarchal Exarch of Jerusalem and Amman
- Nerses Zabarian (see above 27 May 2023 – Present)

== See also ==
- Catholic Church in Iraq
