= Armenian Catholic Archeparchy of Istanbul =

Eastern Catholic archeparchy in Turkey

Coordinates: 41.0356°N 28.9798°E

Archeparchy of Istanbul Constantinopolitanus Armenorum İstanbul Archeparchy
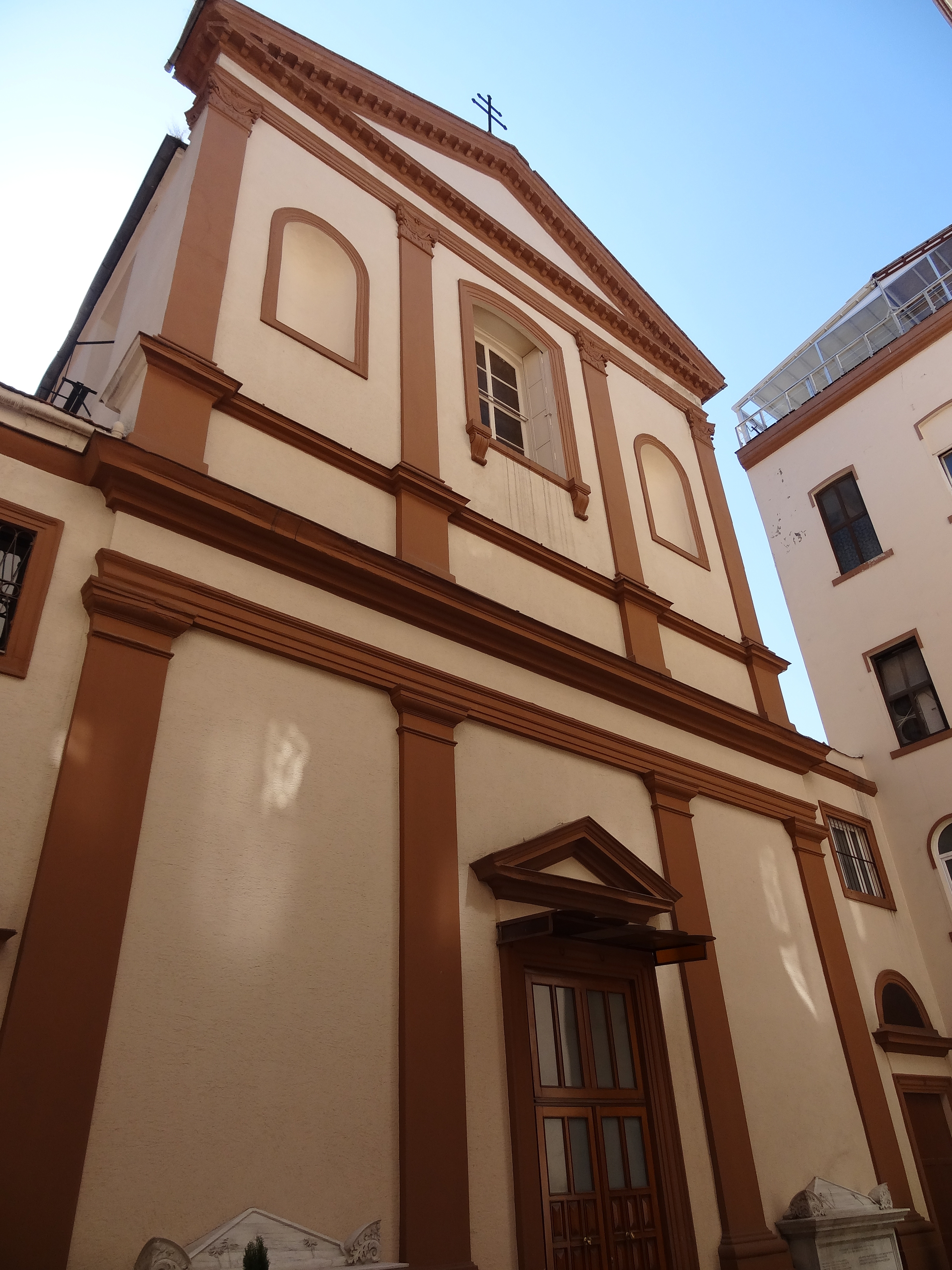
- Armenian catholic cathedral in Istanbul

Location
- Country: Turkey
- Metropolitan: Immediately Subject to the Patriarch
- Population: (as of 2009); 3,450

Information
- Denomination: Armenian Catholic Church
- Rite: Armenian Rite
- Established: 15 October 1928
- Cathedral: Cathedral of St Mary of Sakızağaç in Istanbul

Current leadership
- Pope: Leo XIV
- Patriarch: Raphaël Bedros XXI Minassian
- Apostolic Administrator: Vartan Kirakos
- Bishops emeritus: Kévork Khazoumian Coadjutor Archbishop Emeritus

The Armenian Catholic Archeparchy of Istanbul, also known as Armenian Catholic Archdiocese of Constantinople, serves Armenian Catholics in Turkey and is under the Armenian Catholic Patriarch of Cilicia. Its cathedral is St. Mary of Sakızağaç Cathedral in Istanbul.

== History ==
The eparchy was established by Pope Pius VIII on 6 July 1830. Pope Gregory XVI referred to it as "a new see" in a letter addressed to its first Archbishop, Antonio Nurigian sent on 3 February 1832.

The eparchy was combined with the Armenian Catholic Patriarchate of Cilicia from 1866 until 1928 and was the patriarch's see, based in Istanbul. When the patriarchal seat was moved to Beirut, Lebanon, the current archeparchy was erected on 15 October 1928.

On 21 March 2015, it was made known that the Patriarch of Cilicia of the Armenians, with the consent of the Synod of Bishops of the Patriarchal Church, and after having informed the Holy See, had accepted the resignation of Archbishop Hovhannes Tcholakian.

Mons. Boghos Lévon Zékiyan was then elected Archbishop of Istanbul by the Synod of Bishops of the Patriarchal Church of Armenia.

On the 21 October 2024, The Synod of the Church of Cilicia of the Armenians has accepted the resignation from the pastoral care of the archeparchy of Istanbul of the Armenians, presented by Archbishop Lévon Boghos Zékiyan, and has appointed the Reverend Archpriest Vartan Kirakos Kazanjian, until now protosyncellus of the same archeparchy, as eparchial archbishop of Istanbul of the Armenians, Turkey.

In 2008 there were 3,650 Armenian Catholics belonging to the diocese.

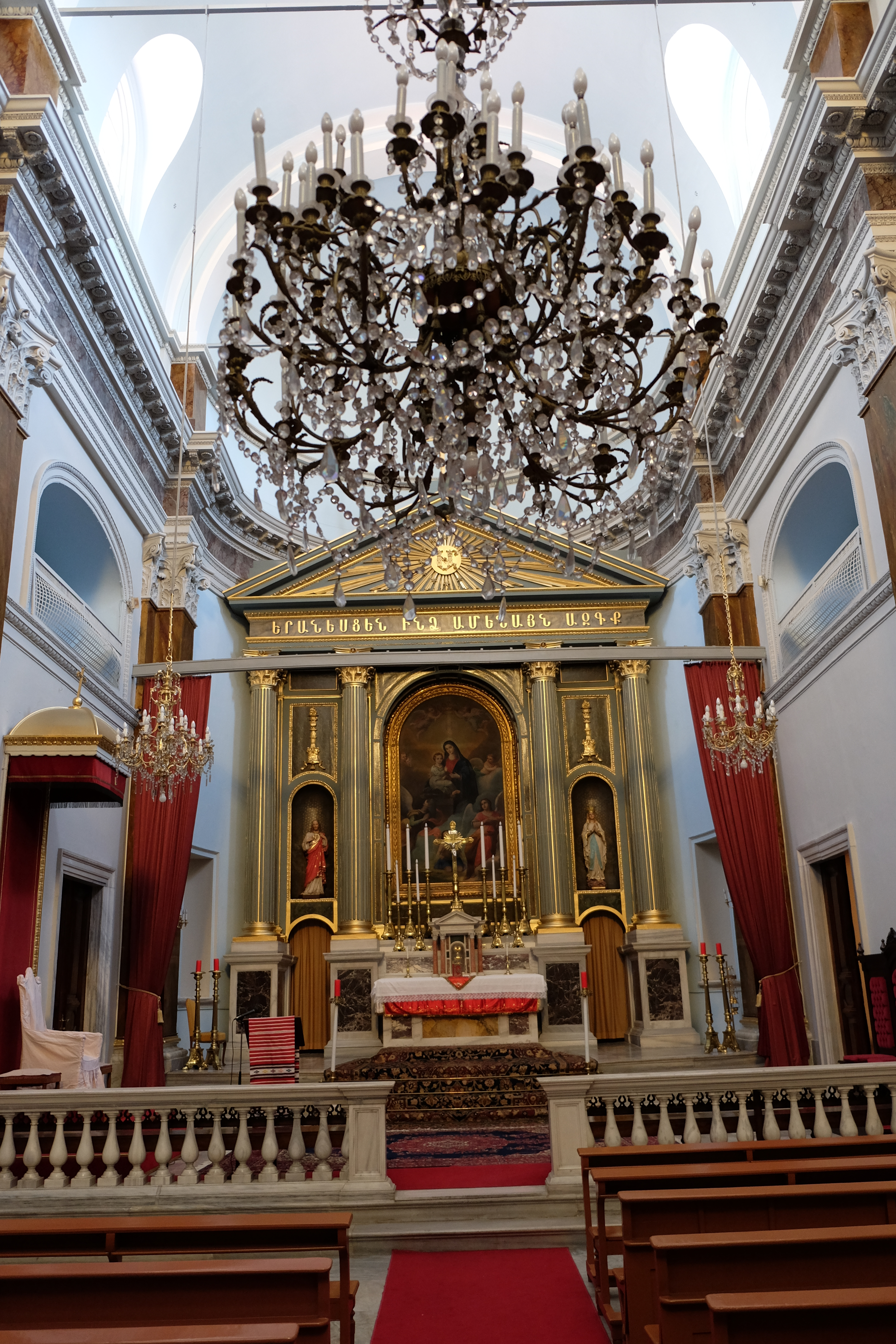
Cathedral interior

== See also ==
- Catholic Church in Turkey
