= Nerses Zabarian =

Syrian-born Iraqi Armenian Catholic archbishop (born 1969)

The Most Reverend Nersès Zabarian
- Archbishop of the Armenian Catholic Archeparchy of Baghdad
- Church: Armenian Catholic Church
- Archdiocese: Baghdad
- Appointed: 27 May 2023
- Installed: 27 August 2023
- Predecessor: Emmanuel Dabbaghian
- Other post: Patriarchal Exarch of Jerusalem and Amman (2019–2022)
- Previous post: Apostolic Administrator of Baghdad (2018–2023)

Orders
- Ordination: 31 October 1999
- Consecration: 27 August 2023 by Raphaël Bedros XXI Minassian

Personal details
- Born: Joseph Zabarian; 6 June 1969 (age 57) Aleppo, Syria
- Residence: Baghdad, Iraq
- Education: Pontifical Oriental Institute, Pontifical Gregorian University

Nersès Joseph Zabarian (also Zabarra; born 6 June 1969) is a Syrian-born Iraqi Armenian Catholic hierarch, who has served as the Archbishop of the Armenian Catholic Archeparchy of Baghdad in Iraq. He previously served as the Apostolic Administrator of the same see from 2018 until his episcopal election in 2023, and also was a Patriarchal Exarch of the Armenian Catholic Patriarchal Exarchate of Jerusalem and Amman since 2019 until 2022.

== Early life and education ==
Nersès Zabarian was born in Aleppo, Syria, in 1969. He began his religious formation at the Armenian Seminary of Aleppo and later continued his studies in Rome at the Pontifical Armenian College. He attended the Pontifical Oriental Institute and the Pontifical Gregorian University, where he specialized in philosophy and theology.

== Priesthood ==
He was ordained a priest on 31 October 1999 for the Armenian Catholic Archeparchy of Aleppo. Following his ordination, he served in various pastoral roles, including: parish priest of the Church of the Holy Cross in Aleppo; director of the "Zarian" Armenian school; chancellor and under-secretary of the Archeparchy of Aleppo. On 27 September 2016 he was appointed as Administrator of the Armenian Catholic Archeparchy of Baghdad

== Episcopal ministry ==
On 23 June 2018, Pope Francis appointed him as the Apostolic Administrator sede vacante of the Armenian Catholic Archeparchy of Baghdad following the retirement of Archbishop Emmanuel Dabbaghian. In this capacity, he worked extensively to revitalize the Armenian community in Iraq, which had been significantly impacted by years of conflict. In 2019, he met with Armenian diplomatic representatives in Baghdad to discuss the preservation of Armenian cultural and religious heritage in the region.

While serving in Baghdad, he was also appointed as the Patriarchal Exarch of Jerusalem and Amman on 10 May 2019. He held this position until 11 September 2022, overseeing Armenian Catholic communities in Palestine, Israel, and Jordan.

Zabarian has also been an active voice in ecumenical and interfaith relations in the Middle East. He was a signatory to statements by Christian leaders in the region condemning policies that threatened the stability of the Christian presence in the Holy Land, describing certain annexation policies as "serious and catastrophic" for the peace process.

On 27 May 2023, Pope Francis confirmed his election by the Synod of Bishops of the Armenian Catholic Church as the Archbishop of Baghdad. He received his episcopal consecration and was enthroned on 27 August 2023 by Patriarch Raphaël Bedros XXI Minassian.
