= Church of Our Lady of Sorrows, Jerusalem =

Coordinates: 31.7799°N 35.2324°E

Church of Our Lady of Sorrows
- Hebrew: כנסיית גבירתנו הדואבת
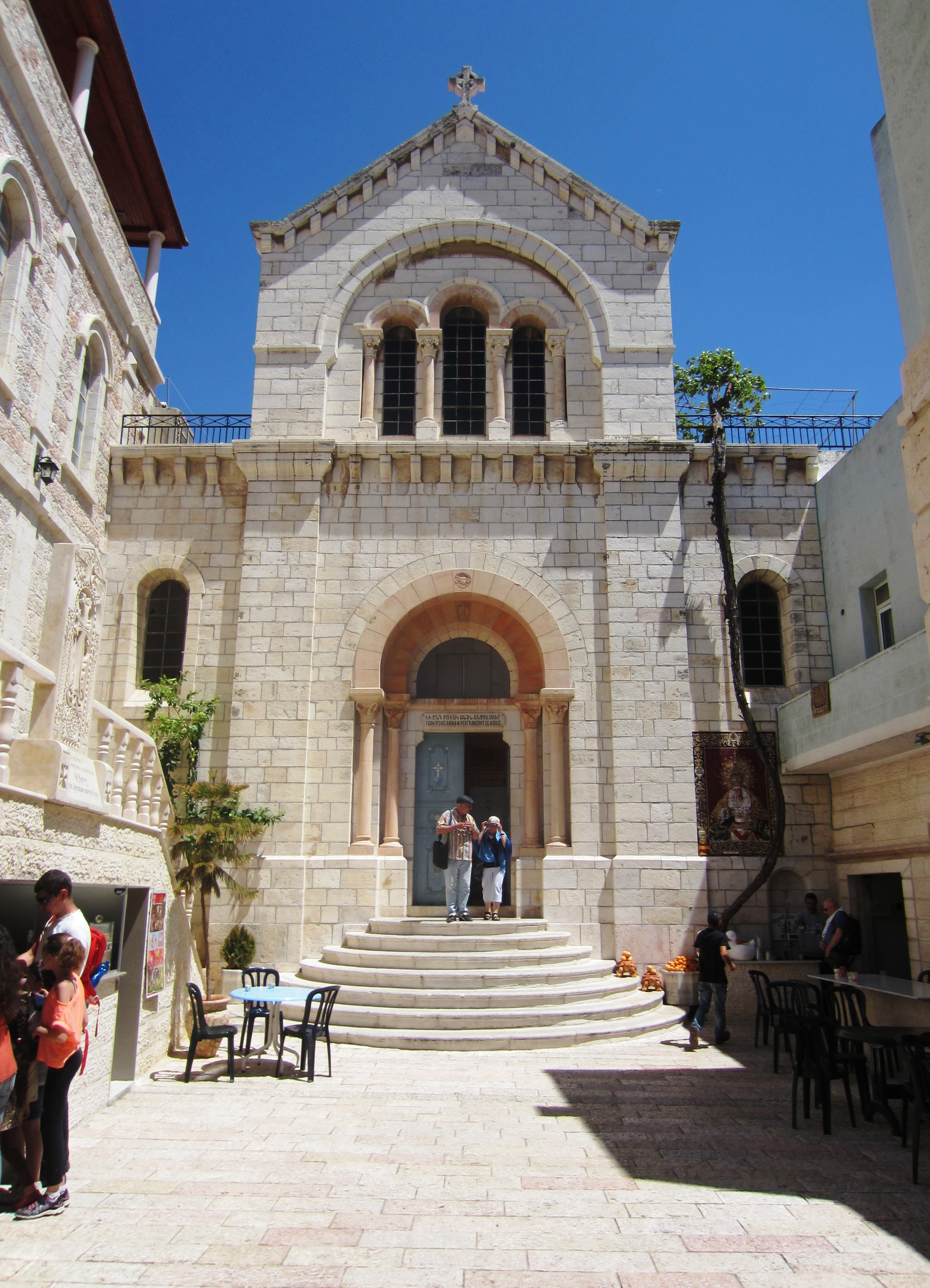
- Entrance of the Church of Our Lady of Sorrows
- Church of Our Lady of Sorrows
- Location: Old City of Jerusalem
- Country: Israel/Palestine
- Denomination: Armenian Catholic Church

History
- Dedication: Our Lady of Sorrows

Architecture
- Heritage designation: World Heritage Site of UNESCO (1981)
- Completed: 1881

Administration
- Diocese: Armenian Catholic Patriarchal Exarchate of Jerusalem and Amman

The Church of Our Lady of Sorrows (Hebrew: כנסיית גבירתנו הדואבת), or the Church of Sorrows of Mary, also called the Armenian Chapel of Our Lady of the Spasm, is an Armenian Catholic church building in the Old City of Jerusalem erected in 1881.

Located at the fourth station on the Via Dolorosa, not far from the Ecce Homo Arch and across the street from the Austrian Hospice in the Muslim Quarter of the Old City of Jerusalem, it commemorates Jesus' encounter on the way to his crucifixion with his mother. The building includes a chapel dedicated to the Virgin Mary, and is thus named in dedicated to her under the title Our Lady of Sorrows.

As the seat of the Armenian Catholic Patriarchal Exarchate of Jerusalem and Amman of the Armenian Catholic Church, an Eastern Catholic particular church sui iuris in full communion with the Pope in Rome, and the Catholic Church, the church building holds the status of cathedral. The facility is also the Armenian Catholic hospice in Jerusalem.

It is a World Heritage Site of UNESCO since 1981.

== See also ==
- Catholic Church in Palestine
