= Hovhannes Tcholakian =

Turkish Roman Catholic archbishop (1919–2016)

His Excellency, Archbishop Hovhannes Tcholakian
- Armenian Catholic Archeparch of Istanbul
- See: Istanbul
- Elected: 1966
- Installed: 1967
- Term ended: 2015
- Predecessor: Paul Kiredjian
- Successor: Boghos Lévon Zékiyan

Orders
- Ordination: 25 April 1943
- Consecration: 5 March 1967 by Gregorio Pietro Agagianian

Personal details
- Born: 12 April 1919 Istanbul, Turkey
- Died: 16 September 2016 (aged 97)

Hovhannes Tcholakian (12 April 1919 – 16 September 2016) was a Turkish-Armenian Archbishop of the Armenian Catholic Church.

Tcholakian was born in Istanbul and ordained a priest in Istanbul on 25 April 1943. He was elected archbishop on 23 May 1966 and consecrated on 16 January 1967. Between 1967 and 2015 he served as Archbishop of Istanbul. In March 2015 the Armenian Catholic Patriarch Nerses Bedros XIX Tarmouni accepted the resignation of Archbishop Tcholakian on grounds of age. He died in September 2016 at the age of 97.
