= St. Gregory the Illuminator Cathedral (Glendale, California) =

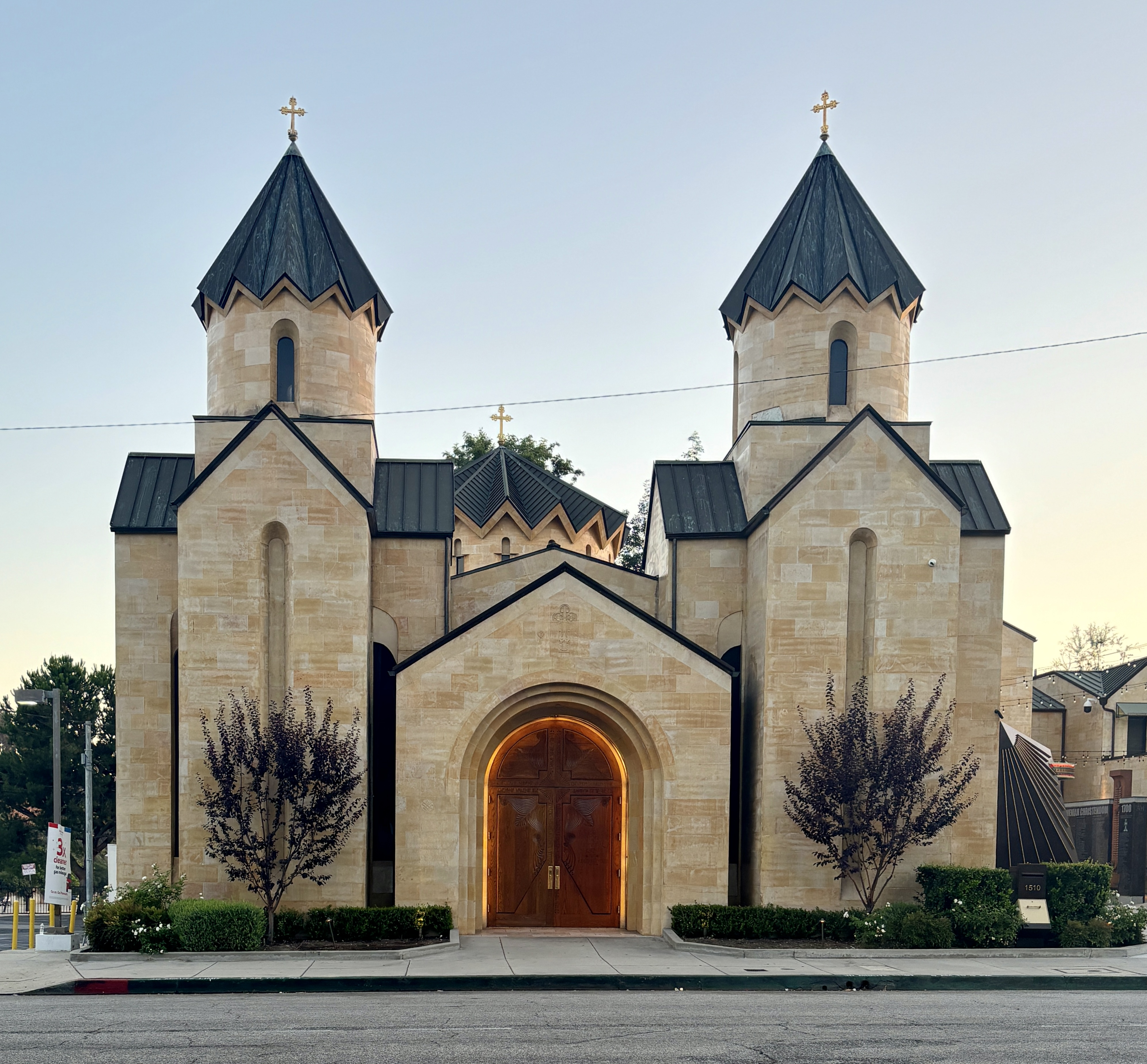

- Location within California
- 34.165284°N 118.232949°W
- Location: 1510 E. Mountain St. Glendale, California
- Country: United States
- Denomination: Armenian Catholic Church

History
- Dedication: Gregory the Illuminator
- Consecrated: March 18, 2001

Architecture
- Style: Armenian church architecture
- Groundbreaking: 1999
- Completed: 2001

Administration
- Diocese: Eparchy of Our Lady of Nareg

Clergy
- Bishop: Mikaël Antoine Mouradian

St. Gregory the Illuminator Cathedral is an Armenian Catholic cathedral located in Glendale, California, United States. It is the seat for the Armenian Catholic Eparchy of Our Lady of Nareg in the United States of America and Canada.

== History ==
In the 19th century Catholic Armenians from Western Armenia, mainly from the towns and cities of Karin (Erzurum), Constantinople, Mardin etc., came to the United States seeking employment. At the end of the same century, many survivors of the Hamidian massacres had concentrated in several U.S. cities, chiefly in New York. Catholic Armenian communities were also founded in New Jersey, Boston, Detroit, Los Angeles, and other cities of California.

Catholic Armenian educational organizations were also founded in many cities. In Philadelphia and Boston Colleges of Armenian sisters were founded, educating hundreds of children. Later, a similar college was founded in Los Angeles. Mechitarists were preoccupied with the problem of preserving Armenian identity. By the effort of Mekhitarists in Venice and Vienna, the Mkhitarian College was founded in Los Angeles.

Many Armenians came to the United States and Canada from the Middle Eastern countries of Lebanon and Syria in the 1970s and in later years. Also many Armenians immigrated from Argentina, because of the economic crisis. At the same time, many Catholic Armenians inside the United States moved to San Francisco, San Diego, Chicago, Washington D.C., Atlanta, Miami and Indianapolis.

Rev. Raphaël Minassian was appointed to the mission in Los Angeles in 1989, taking up residence at Our Lady Queen of Martyrs. He began to plan a new church in Glendale. Minassian acquired a Lutheran church on Mountain Street in 1997. The building was renovated so the Armenian rite liturgy could be celebrated. The Armenian style altar was created by Fathers Raphael and Dajad Yardemian. St. Gregory the Illuminator parish was established in 1998 and Minassian left Our Lady Queen of Martyrs. The old church was torn down to make way for a new church. The cornerstone for the present church was laid on August 15, 1999. It was designed in the traditional Armenian style and took two years to construct. The property includes a monument commemorating the seventeen centuries of Armenian Christianity. It features the names of all the sponsors and benefactors of the parish. Bishop Manuel Batakian, the Exarch of Armenian Catholics in the United States and Canada, consecrated the church on March 18, 2001.

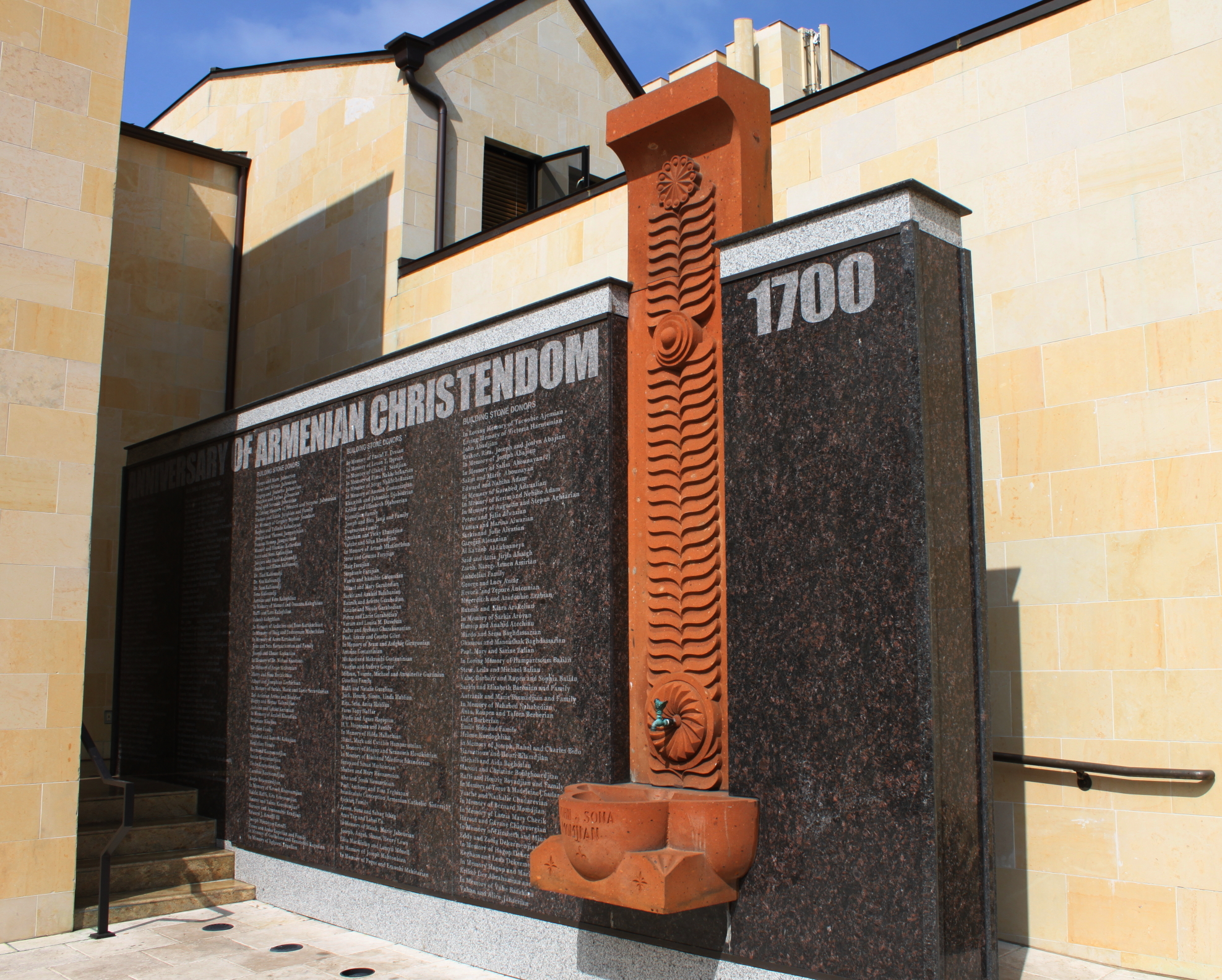
The monument commemorating the 17 centuries of Armenian Christianity.

Minassian left St. Gregory's in 2004 and was replaced by Rev. Andon Noradounkian who had come to the parish the year before as assistant pastor. The following year he was replaced by Rev. Andon Saroyan.

In 2005, by Pope Benedict XVI's decision, the Catholic Exarchate of the USA and Canada was advanced to the status of a diocese. It serviced 35,000 Catholic Armenians in the United States and some 10,000 in Canada. The bishop, or eparch, of the diocese, which has jurisdiction over Canadian and American Catholics who are members of the Armenian Catholic Church, became Manuel Batakian. According to a Monday, May 23, 2011, news release by the United States Conference of Catholic Bishops, Pope Benedict XVI, named Archpriest Mikaël Antoine Mouradian, superior of the Convent of Notre Dame in Bzommar, Lebanon, as the new bishop of the Eparchy of Our Lady of Nareg in New York for Armenian Catholics. The appointment of Lebanon-born Bishop Mouradian was publicized in Washington, May 21, by Archbishop Pietro Sambi, Apostolic Nuncio to the United States.

In 2012, the eparchy moved from New York City to Glendale, California. The church in New York was being sold and while the eparchy was offered a new church, the bishop decided to move the eparchy to Glendale since there were more Armenian Catholic families in the area than in New York.

== See also ==
- List of Catholic cathedrals in the United States
- List of cathedrals in the United States
