= St. Ann's Armenian Catholic Cathedral =

Church in Manhattan, New York

St. Ann's Cathedral
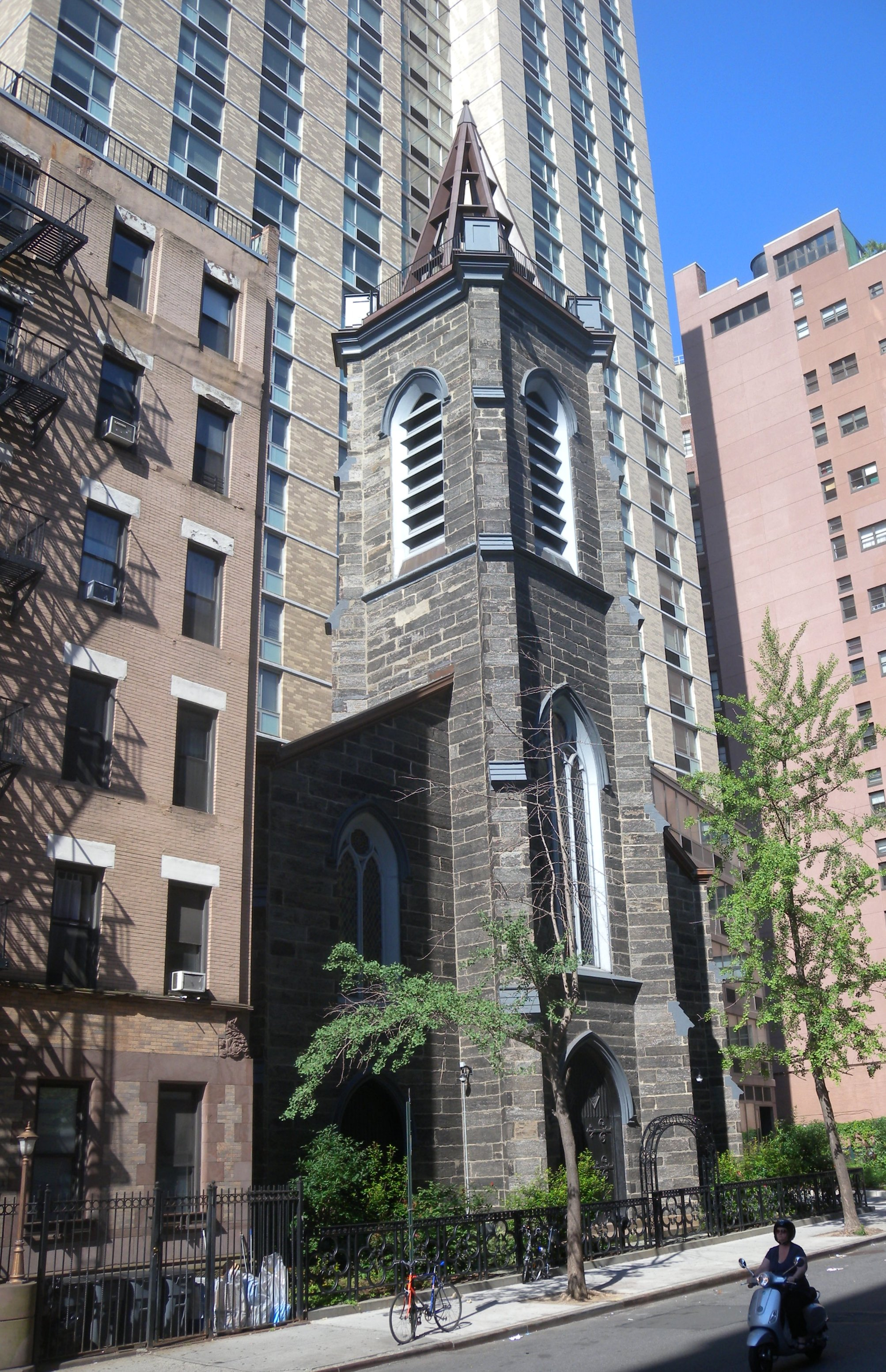
- The façade and bell tower of the former St. Ann's Cathedral in Manhattan.
- St. Ann's Cathedral
- 40°43′55.99″N 73°59′20.81″W
- Location: New York City: 110 E. 12th St., Manhattan; 167 N. 6th St., Brooklyn
- Country: United States
- Denomination: Armenian Catholic Church

History
- Founded: 1983

Architecture
- Closed: 2005

Administration
- Diocese: Eparchy of Our Lady of Nareg

St. Ann's Cathedral was an Armenian Catholic cathedral and national shrine located in New York, New York, United States. It was the seat for the Eparchy of Our Lady of Nareg. The church had two locations in the city: the former St. Ann's Roman Catholic Church on East 12th Street on the Lower East Side of Manhattan and at the former St. Vincent de Paul Church in Williamsburg, Brooklyn. The Armenian Catholic parish of St. Ann continues to function in a church in Brooklyn.

== History ==
Father Mardiros Meguerian was appointed as the first priest to minister to Armenian Catholics in New York. He was sent by Patriarch Stephan Peter X Azarian in 1896. Meguerian was named the General Vicar of Armenian Catholics in the United States in 1911. He was succeeded by Father Haroutioun Maljian whose ministry in New York spanned 50 years from 1921 to 1971. It was during his successors pastorate, Father Krikor Guerguerian, that Bishop Mikail Nersès Sétian was sent to New York in 1982 to lead the newly established Apostolic Exarchate of United States of America and Canada for the Armenians. Until this time the Divine Liturgy was celebrated in Roman Catholic Churches in Brooklyn and Queens.

Cardinal Terence Cooke of the Roman Catholic Archdiocese of New York offered St. Ann's Church on the Lower East Side of Manhattan for use as the Armenian Catholic cathedral. The offer was accepted and St. Ann's Cathedral was established in 1983. In 2002, Cardinal Edward Egan requested that the exarchate surrender the facilities at St. Ann's . Attempts were made to save the cathedral, but in the end the exarchate had no choice. Bishop Thomas Daily and his successor Bishop Nicholas DiMarzio of the Roman Catholic Diocese of Brooklyn offered St. Vincent de Paul Church in the Williamsburg section of Brooklyn as a new site for both the exarchate and the cathedral parish. This offer was accepted and the name of St. Ann's Cathedral was maintained.

The use of St. Vincent de Paul Church was short lived. The church was sold by the Roman Catholic diocese to a developer in 2011. St. Ann's parish subsequently moved to Holy Family Roman Catholic Church, a Slovak-heritage parish, in the Greenpoint neighborhood of Brooklyn. Its status as a cathedral, however, did not go with it. The cathedral for the eparchy has since been transferred to St. Gregory the Illuminator Church in Glendale, California.
