= Jean Teyrouz =

Syrian-born Armenian Catholic bishop (born 1941)

Most Reverend Jean Teyrouz ICPB
- Bishop Emeritus of Sainte-Croix-de-Paris
- Church: Armenian Catholic Church
- Diocese: Sainte-Croix-de-Paris
- Installed: 2 February 2013
- Term ended: 23 June 2018
- Predecessor: Grégoire Ghabroyan
- Successor: Elie Yéghiayan
- Other post: Apostolic Visitor for Armenian Catholics in Western Europe (2013–2020)
- Previous posts: Titular Bishop of Melitene degli Armeni (2000–2013); Curial Bishop of Cilicia (2000–2013)

Orders
- Ordination: 24 December 1965 by Gregorio Pietro Agagianian
- Consecration: 25 March 2001 by Nerses Bedros XIX Tarmouni

Personal details
- Born: 6 May 1941 (age 85) Aleppo, First Syrian Republic
- Education: Pontifical Gregorian University, Saint Joseph University of Beirut

Jean Teyrouz I.C.P.B. (or Hovhannes Teyrouzian; born 6 May 1941) is a Syrian-born Armenian Catholic hierarch. He served as the Eparchial Bishop of the Eparchy of Sainte-Croix-de-Paris in France from 2013 until his retirement in 2018. Previously he served as Titular Bishop of Melitene degli Armeni and Curial Bishop of Cilicia (2000–2013).

== Biography ==
=== Early life and ministry ===
Jean Teyrouz was born in Aleppo, Syria, in 1941. He joined the Patriarchal Congregation of Bzommar and was ordained a priest on 24 December 1965 by Cardinal Gregorio Pietro Agagianian in Rome. Following his ordination, he pursued higher studies in Rome at the Pontifical Gregorian University, finishing in 1966 and at the Saint Joseph University of Beirut in Lebanon.

Teyrouz spent much of his early ministry in Lebanon and Syria. He served as the rector of the minor and major seminaries in Bzommar and worked extensively in pastoral care, particularly in the Bourj Hammoud district of Beirut. Between 1976 and 1979, he earned a master's degree in social work, a field he cited as foundational to his pastoral approach.

=== Episcopal ministry ===
On 27 September 2000, he was appointed Curial Bishop of the Armenian Catholic Patriarchate of Cilicia and Titular Bishop of Melitene degli Armeni. He received his episcopal consecration on 25 March 2001 from Patriarch Nerses Bedros XIX Tarmouni.

On 2 February 2013, Pope Benedict XVI appointed Teyrouz as the Bishop of the Armenian Catholic Eparchy of Sainte-Croix-de-Paris, succeeding Grégoire Ghabroyan. During his tenure, he was a vocal advocate for the protection of Christians in the Middle East, particularly during the Syrian Civil War.

Upon reaching the age limit, he submitted his resignation, which was accepted by Pope Francis on 23 June 2018. He was succeeded by Elie Yéghiayan. On 27 June 2020 he also retired as an apostolic visitor for Armenian faithful resident in Western Europe.

In September 2021, following the death of Patriarch Krikor Bedros XX Ghabroyan, he participated in the Elective Synod of the Armenian Catholic Church convened by Pope Francis at the Pontifical Armenian College in Rome. He was part of the body of bishops that elected Raphaël Bedros XXI Minassian as the new Patriarch of Cilicia.
