= Armenian Catholic Eparchy of Our Lady of Nareg in the United States of America and Canada =

Armenian Catholic territory in North America

Eparchy of Our Lady of Nareg Eparchia Dominae Nostrae Naregensis
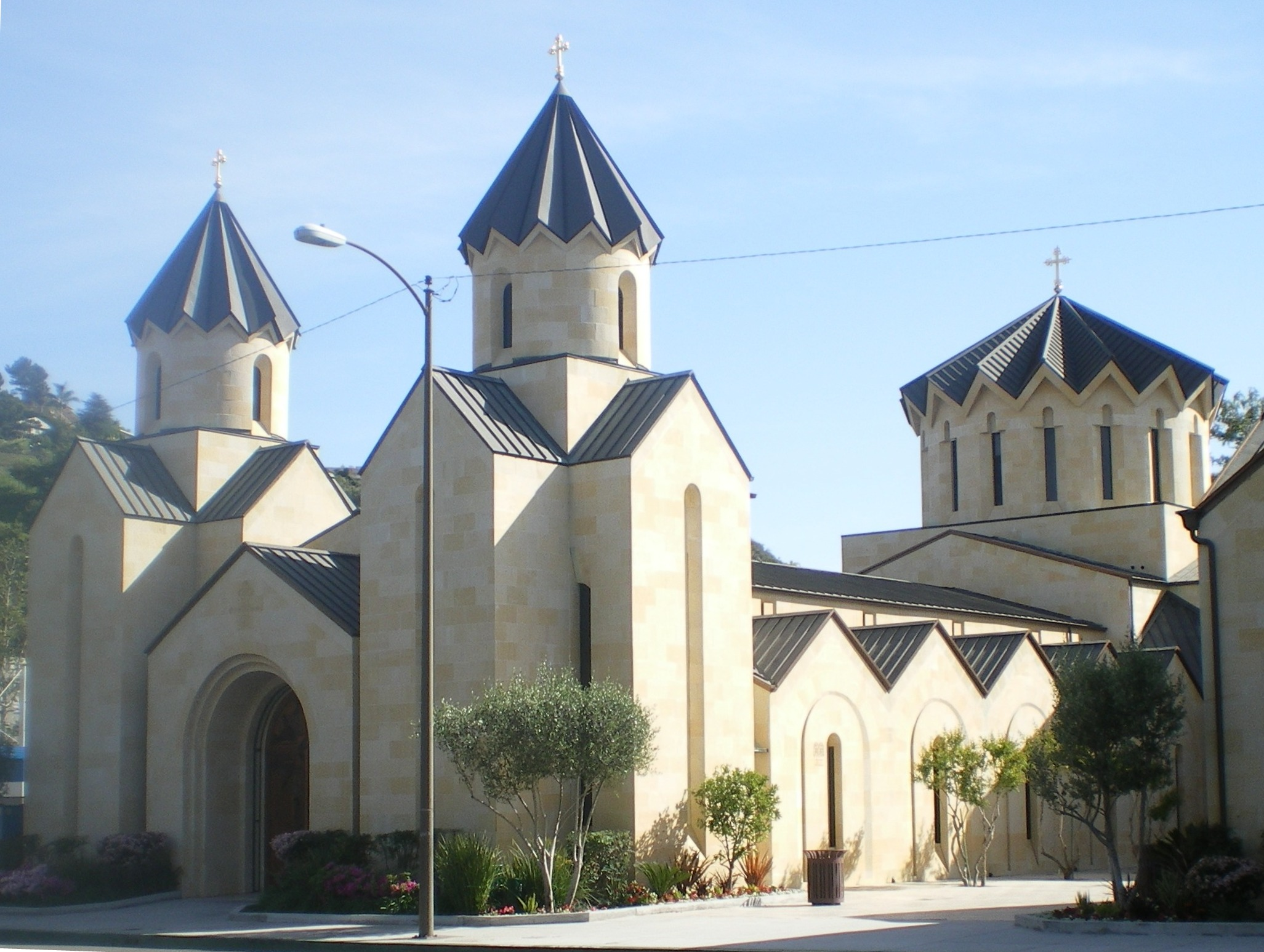
- St. Gregory the Illuminator Cathedral

Location
- Country: United States of America
- Ecclesiastical province: Exempt to the Holy See

Statistics
- Population: (as of 2010); 36,000
- Parishes: 9

Information
- Sui iuris church: Armenian Catholic Church
- Rite: Armenian Rite
- Established: July 3, 1981 (45 years ago)
- Cathedral: St. Gregory the Illuminator Cathedral

Current leadership
- Pope: Leo XIV
- Eparch: Mikaël Antoine Mouradian, I.C.P.B.
- Auxiliary Bishops: Parsegh Baghdassarian

Armenian Catholic Eparchy of Our Lady of Nareg in the United States of America and Canada (Latin: Eparchia Dominae Nostrae Naregensis) is an Armenian Catholic Church ecclesiastical territory or eparchy of the Catholic Church located in Glendale, California, United States, and is immediately subject to the Holy See. It was created by John Paul II on July 3, 1981, as the Apostolic Exarchate of United States of America and Canada for the Armenians. It was elevated to an eparchy on September 12, 2005. The seat of the eparchy is St. Gregory the Illuminator Cathedral in Glendale, California. The eparchy has also been known as Eparchy of Our Lady of Nareg in New York and Eparchy of Our Lady of Nareg in Glendale.

In 2012, the eparchy moved from New York City to Glendale, California. The church in New York was being sold and while the eparchy was offered a new church, the bishop decided to move the eparchy to Glendale since there were more Armenian Catholic families in the area than in New York.

== Eparchs ==
- Mikail Nersès Sétian † (July 3, 1981 – September 18, 1993) Retired
- Hovhannes Tertsakian, C.A.M. † (January 5, 1995 – November 30, 2000) Retired
- Manuel Batakian, I.C.P.B. † (November 30, 2000 – May 21, 2011) Retired
- Mikaël Antoine Mouradian, I.C.P.B. (May 21, 2011 – present)

=== Auxiliaries ===
- Parsegh Baghdassarian (2024 - present)

== Parish locations ==
- Belmont, Massachusetts
- Detroit, Michigan
- Glendale, California
- Little Falls, New Jersey
- Los Angeles, California
- New York City, New York (St. Ann’s Cathedral)
- Wynnewood, Pennsylvania
- Saint-Laurent, Quebec
- Toronto, Ontario
