= St. Gregory the Illuminator Cathedral, Athens =

Coordinates: 37.957620347222615°N 23.725309857313274°E

St. Gregory the Illuminator Cathedral
- Καθεδρικός Ναός του Αγίου Γρηγορίου του Φωτιστού
- St. Gregory the Illuminator Cathedral
- Location: Athens
- Country: Greece
- Denomination: Armenian Catholic Church

Cathedral of Saint Gregory

The St. Gregory the Illuminator Cathedral (Greek: Καθεδρικός Ναός του Αγίου Γρηγορίου του Φωτιστού) also called Armenian Church of St. Gregory the Illuminator is an Armenian Catholic cathedral located at 2 Rene Pio, Neos Kosmos in Athens, Greece.

It functions as the seat of the Armenian Catholic Ordinariate of Greece a jurisdiction created for Catholics of the Armenian rite that was established in 1925 by Pope Pius XI and directly under the administration of the Holy See.

Currently the ordinariate is vacant so it does not have a bishop responsible. Father Hovsep Bezazian is the apostolic administrator.

== See also ==
- Roman Catholicism in Greece
- St. Gregory the Illuminator
