= Paul Coussa =

- Archbishop of Armenian Catholic Archeparchy of Baghdad
- Church: Armenian Catholic Church
- See: Armenian Catholic Diocese of Baghdad
- In office: 1983–2001
- Predecessor: Hovhannes Kasparian
- Successor: Emmanuel Dabbaghian
- Previous post(s): Bishop

Orders
- Ordination: 17 April 1941

Personal details
- Born: 9 September 1917; Alep, Syria
- Died: 7 July 2012 (aged 94)

Paul Coussa (9 September 1917 – 7 July 2012) was a Syrian born Iraqi prelate of the Armenian Catholic Church.

Born in Alep, Syria, he was ordained a priest in 1941, aged 23. He was appointed Auxiliary Bishop of the Antioch Syrian diocese on 26 August 1969, along with Titular Bishop of Colonia in Armenia. He was ordained bishop on 21 December 1969. He was appointed bishop of the Armenian Catholic Diocese of Baghdad on June 27, 1983 until his retirement on October 13, 2001, aged 94.

Catholic Church titles
| Preceded by Hovhannes Kasparian | Archbishop of Armenian Catholic Archeparchy of Baghdad; 1983–2001 | Succeeded by Emmanuel Dabbaghian |
