= Hovhannes Bedros XVIII Kasparian =

Head of the Armenian Catholic Church from 1982 to 1998

Hovhannes Bedros XVIII Kasparian I.C.P.B.
- Patriarch of Cicilia
- Native name: Յովհաննէս Պետրոս ԺԸ Գասպարեան
- Church: Armenian Catholic Church
- See: Patriarchate of Cilicia
- In office: 5 August 1982 – 28 November 1998
- Predecessor: Hemaiag Bedros XVII Ghedighian
- Successor: Nerses Bedros XIX Tarmouni
- Previous post: Archeparch of Baghdad (1972-1982)

Orders
- Ordination: 13 April 1952
- Consecration: 25 February 1973 by Ignatius Bedros XVI Batanian

Personal details
- Born: 20 January 1927 Cairo, Kingdom of Egypt
- Died: 16 January 2011 (aged 83) Bzommar, Mount Lebanon Governorate, Lebanon

Hovhannes Bedros XVIII Kasparian, I.P.C.B. (Armenian: Յովհաննէս Պետրոս ԺԸ Գասպարեան; English: John Petros XVIII Kasparian; French: Jean Pierre XVIII Kasparian; 20 January 1927 – 16 January 2011) was the Patriarch of Cilicia in the Armenian Catholic Church from 1982 to 1998.

== Biography ==
Kasparian was born in Cairo and began his studies in 1943 at the Institut du Clergé Patriarcal de Bzommar. In 1946 he studied Philosophy and Theology at the Pontifical Gregorian University in Rome, Italy. He was ordained to the priesthood in 1952 and was vice-president of the Institut du Clergé Patriarcal de Bzommar and taught at Levonian School in Rome until 1957 when he was named as head of the Egyptian Armenian Catholic community. He was ordained as archbishop in 1972 and became Archbishop of Baghdad of the Armenian Catholic Church in Iraq starting 25 February 1973.

He was elected as the Catolicos-Patriarch of Cilicia of the Armenian Catholic Church in a synod meeting on 5 August 1982. The official ceremony was held in Bzommar, Lebanon on 12 September 1982. He ruled in difficult times of the Lebanese Civil War and its aftermath. After the declaration of the independence of Armenia, he also established a bishopric for the Armenian Catholics in Armenia, Georgia and its Armenian region of Javakheti.

Patriarch Kasparian retired in 1998 upon reaching the obligatory of 70 years according to the rules of the Armenian Catholic Church and withdrew to Bzommar. He died after a long illness on 16 January 2011, four days before his 84th birthday, in Lebanon.

== See also ==
- List of Armenian Catholic Patriarchs of Cilicia

Catholic Church titles
Preceded by Nersès Tayroyan	Armenian Catholic Archbishop of Baghdad; 1972–1982	Succeeded by Paul Coussa
Preceded by Hemaiag Petros XVII Ghedighian	Patriarch Catholicos of Cilicia; 1982–1998	Succeeded by Nerses Bedros XIX Tarmouni
