= Gregory Peter XX Ghabroyan =

Head of the Armenian Catholic Church from 2015 to 2021

His Beatitude Gregory Peter XX Ghabroyan I.C.P.B.
- Catholicos-Patriarch of Cilicia
- Native name: Գրիգոր Պետրոս Ի. Կապրոյեան (Krikor Bedros XX Ghabroyan)
- Church: Armenian Catholic Church
- Archdiocese: Cilicia
- See: Patriarchate of Cilicia
- Elected: 24 July 2015
- Installed: 9 August 2015
- Term ended: 25 May 2021
- Predecessor: Nerses Bedros XIX Tarmouni
- Successor: Raphaël Bedros XXI Minassian
- Other post: Armenian Catholic Bishop of France
- Previous post: Armenian Catholic Bishop of France (1977–2013)

Orders
- Ordination: 28 March 1959
- Consecration: 13 February 1977 by Hemaiag Bedros XVII Ghedighian

Personal details
- Born: Գրիգոր Կապրոյեան (Krikor Gabroyan); 14 November 1934 Aleppo, Syria (under French mandate)
- Died: 25 May 2021 (aged 86) Beirut, Lebanon
- Denomination: Armenian Catholic
- Residence: Lebanon
- Education: Armenian Pontifical College; Pontifical Gregorian University

Styles of Krikor Bedros XX
- Reference style: His Beatitude
- Spoken style: Your Beatitude
- Religious style: Catholicos

Krikor Bedros XX Gabroyan, I.P.C.B. (Armenian: Գրիգոր Պետրոս Ի. Կապրոյեան; English: Gregory Peter XX Gabroyan; French; Grégoire Pierre XX Ghabroyan; 14 November 1934 – 25 May 2021) was the Patriarch of Cilicia in the Armenian Catholic Church from 2015 until his death in 2021. He was a member of the Patriarchal Congregation of Bzommar.

== Biography ==
Gabroyan felt a vocation for the priesthood and studied at Bzommar Patriarchal Monastery continuing at the Collège des frères maristes de Jounieh (Lebanon). He was sent to Italy to continue his higher studies at the Armenian Leonine Pontifical College in Rome and graduate studies in Philosophy and Theology at the Pontifical Gregorian University. Upon successful graduation, he returned to Lebanon and was ordained priest on 28 March 1959.

Gabroyan became an instructor in Bzommar Monastery School in 1960 and from 1962 to 1996 served as principal of the Armenian Catholic Mesrobian Secondary School in Bourj Hammoud and from 1969 to 1975 as head of the Bzommar Convent School and secretary to the Convent's executive council.

In 1976, he was appointed for serving the Armenian Catholics in France and was ordained as bishop on 13 February 1977 on the hand of Armenian Catholic Catholicos-Patriarch Hemaiag Bedros XVII Ghedighian serving as Apostolic Exarch in France from 1977 to 1986 and as Primate and Armenian Catholic Eparch and Bishop of France at the Éparchie Sainte-Croix-de-Paris des Arméniens, from 1986 to April 2013 date of his retirement from his duties.

Upon the death of Armenian Catholic Patriarch Catholicos of Cilicia Nerses Bedros XIX Tarmouni on 25 June 2015, he served as administrator of the Church until election of a new Patriarch. The Armenian Catholic Holy Synod of Bishops convened starting 14 July 2015 and elected Gabroyan as Catholicos-Patriarch on 24 July 2015 under the name of Krikor Bedros XX Gabroyan.

He was enthroned on 9 August 2015 in Bzommar, Lebanon.

Krikor Bedros XX Gabroyan died on 25 May 2021 and his death was announced by the Pontificio Collegio Armeno online. On 29 May, Pope Francis issued a statement memorializing Gabroyan and imploring the intercession of St. Gregory of Narek, who was declared a Doctor of the Church in 2015.

== See also ==
- List of Armenian Catholic Patriarchs of Cilicia

Catholic Church titles
Preceded by Nigoghayos Kehiayan	Armenian Catholic Bishop of France; 1977–2013	Succeeded by Jean Teyrouz
Preceded by Nerses Bedros XIX Tarmouni	Patriarch Catholicos of Cilicia; 2015–2021	Succeeded by Raphaël Bedros XXI Minassian
