= Nerses Bedros XIX Tarmouni =

Head of the Armenian Catholic Church from 1999 to 2015

His Beatitude: Nerses Bedros XIX Tarmouni; Ներսէս Պետրոս ԺԹ. Թարմունի
- Patriarch Catholicos of Cilicia
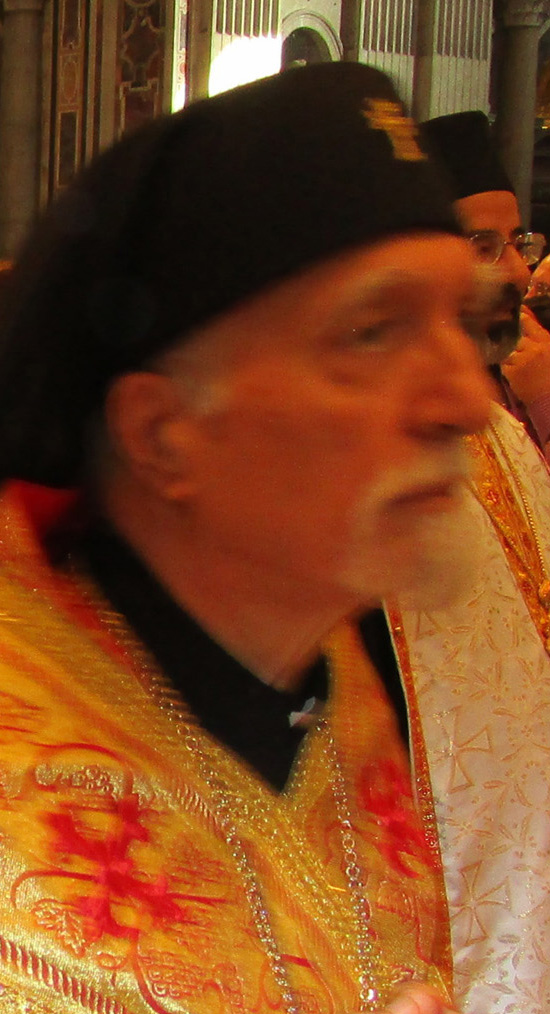
- Patriarch Nerses, at Armenian Cultural Center
- See: Armenian Catholic Patriarchate of Cilicia
- Elected: 7 October 1999
- Appointed: 13 October 1999
- Term ended: 25 June 2015
- Predecessor: Hovhannes Bedros XVIII Kasparian
- Successor: Krikor Bedros XX Gabroyan
- Other post: Armenian Bishop of Alexandria
- Previous post: Armenian Bishop of Alexandria (1989–1999)

Orders
- Ordination: 15 August 1965 by Raphaël Bayan
- Consecration: 18 February 1990 by Hovhannes Bedros XVIII Kasparian

Personal details
- Born: Pierre Taza; 17 January 1940 Cairo, Kingdom of Egypt
- Died: 25 June 2015 (aged 75) Beirut, Lebanon
- Denomination: Armenian Catholic
- Residence: Lebanon
- Parents: Elias Taza and Josephine Azouz

Styles of Nerses Bedros XIX
- Reference style: His Beatitude
- Spoken style: Your Beatitude
- Religious style: Catholicos
- Posthumous style: n/a

Nerses Bedros XIX Tarmouni (Armenian: Ներսէս Պետրոս ԺԹ. Թարմունի, romanized: Nerses Petros ZhT. T'armuni; born Pierre Taza; 17 January 1940 – 25 June 2015) was the patriarch of the Armenian Catholic Church from 1999 until his death in 2015.

== Biography ==
Pierre Taza was the second son and the fifth of eight children born in Cairo to Elias Taza and Josephine Azouz. The couple were Armenian refugees from Ottoman Turkey who fled to Egypt in 1915 during the Armenian genocide. He completed his primary and secondary studies at the college of the Brothers of the Christian Schools (Frères des écoles chrétiennes) in Cairo.

Taza felt a vocation for the priesthood very early in life and thus was sent to the Armenian Leonine Pontifical College in Rome in 1958 where he studied Philosophy and Theology at the Pontifical Gregorian University. His Bishop, Raphaël Bayan ordained him a priest in Cairo on 15 August 1965.

He served the parish of the Armenian Catholic Cathedral of the Annunciation in Cairo from 1965 to 1968 with Fr John Kasparian, who in 1982 became head of the Armenian Catholic Church as Hovhannes Bedros XVIII. From 1968 to 1990, Taza was curate of the parish of St Therese of Heliopolis in Cairo.

On 18 February 1990, Taza was ordained Eparch of Alexandria by Bedros XVIII. From 1992 to 1997, as member of the Catholic hierarchy of Egypt, Taza was the General Secretary of the Pastoral Council of the Catholic Church of Egypt.

As a member of the Synod of the Bishops of the Catholic Armenian Patriarch Church, he was:

- Member of the Council of the three Bishops to direct the Patriarchal Curie from 1993 to 1995
- President of the Patriarchal Commission for the Vocations from 1993 to 1995
- Member of the Permanent Synod as of 1994

In October 1999, he was elected as patriarch by the Bishops of the Holy Synod of the Armenian Catholic Church. He took the name Nerses Bedros XIX.

He remained in this position until his death on June 25, 2015.

== See also ==
- List of Armenian Catholic Patriarchs of Cilicia

Catholic Church titles
Preceded by Raphaël Bayan ICPB	Armenian Catholic Bishop of Alexandria; 1989–1999	Succeeded by Kricor-Okosdinos Coussa
Preceded by Hovhannes Bedros XVIII Kasparian	Patriarch Catholicos of Cilicia; 1999–2015	Succeeded by Krikor Bedros XX Gabroyan
