= Raphaël Bedros XXI Minassian =

Head of the Armenian Catholic Church from 2021 to present

His Beatitude Raphaël Bedros XXI Minassian I.C.P.B.
- Catholicos-Patriarch of Cilicia
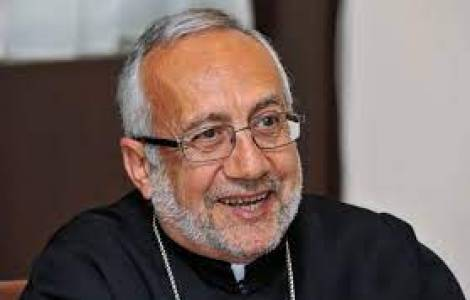
- Native name: Ռաֆայէլ Պետրոս ԻԱ. Մինասեան (Rrafayel Bedros XXI Minasyan)
- Church: Armenian Catholic Church
- Archdiocese: Cilicia
- See: Patriarchate of Cilicia
- Elected: 23 September 2021
- Installed: 24 October 2021
- Predecessor: Gregory Peter XX Ghabroyan
- Successor: Incumbent
- Other posts: Patriarchal Exarch of Armenian Catholic Patriarchal Exarchate of Jerusalem and Amman (2005–2011), Ordinary of Ordinariate for Catholics of Armenian Rite in Eastern Europe, Titular Archbishop of Caesarea in Cappadocia for Armenians (2011–2021)

Orders
- Ordination: 24 June 1973 (Priest)
- Consecration: 16 July 2011 (Bishop) by Nerses Bedros XIX Tarmouni

Personal details
- Born: Raphaël François Minassian; 24 November 1946 (age 79) Beirut, Lebanon
- Education: Pontifical Gregorian University, Salesian Pontifical University

Styles of Raphaël Bedros XXI Minassian
- Reference style: His Beatitude
- Spoken style: Your Beatitude
- Religious style: Catholicos

Raphaël Bedros XXI Minassian, I.C.P.B. (Armenian: Ռաֆայէլ Պետրոս ԻԱ. Մինասեան; born Raphaël François Minassian; 24 November 1946) is a Lebanese-born Armenian prelate who has served as the 21st patriarch of the Armenian Catholic Church since 2021. He previously served as the Ordinary for Catholics of Armenian Rite in Eastern Europe from 2011 to 2021 and as a Patriarchal Exarch of Jerusalem and Amman from 2005 to 2011. He serves as president of Armenian Caritas and is a member of the Patriarchal Congregation of Bzommar.

== Life ==
Raphaël François Minassian was born in Beirut, Lebanon on 24 November 1946. After the primary school education, he joined the Minor seminary of the Patriarchal Congregation of Bzommar in 1958, where he later made a profession. After that, he went on to study in Rome at the Pontifical Levonian Armenian College. He studied at the Pontifical Gregorian University, earning a licentiate in philosophy and theology, and at the Salesian Pontifical University, where he earned a degree in the practical psychology. He was ordained a priest on 24 June 1973.

He then worked in various Armenian Catholic institutions in Lebanon and in the United States and at the same time performed pastoral work for the Armenian Catholics. On 26 September 2005, he was appointed Patriarchal Exarch of the Armenian Catholic Patriarchal Exarchate of Jerusalem and Amman, where he served almost six years.

On 24 June 2011, Pope Benedict XVI appointed Minassian ordinary of the Ordinariate for Catholics of Armenian Rite in Eastern Europe. He received his episcopal consecration on 16 July from Patriarch Nerses Bedros XIX Tarmouni, the Head of the Armenian Catholic Church.

On 23 September 2021, he was elected as the Church's 21st patriarch and took the name Raphaël Bedros XXI Minassian. He was enthroned as Catholicos Patriarch of Cilicia of Armenian Catholics on 24 October 2021 in Armenian Catholic Cathedral of Saint Elias and Saint Gregory the Illuminator in Beirut.

== See also ==
- List of Armenian Catholic patriarchs of Cilicia

Catholic Church titles
Preceded by Kévork Khazoumian	Patriarchal Exarch of Armenian Catholic Patriarchal Exarchate of Jerusalem and Amman; 2005–2011	Succeeded by Kricor-Okosdinos Coussa
Preceded by Manuel Batakian	Titular Archbishop of Caesarea in Cappadocia for Armenians; 2011–2021	Vacant
Preceded by Vahan Ohanian as Apostolic Administrator	Ordinary for Catholics of Armenian Rite in Eastern Europe; 2011–2021	Succeeded by Mikael Bassalé as Apostolic Administrator
Preceded by Gregory Peter XX Ghabroyan	Patriarch Catholicos of Cilicia; 2021–present	Succeeded by Incumbent
