= Patriarchal Congregation of Bzommar =

Armenian Catholic religious institute

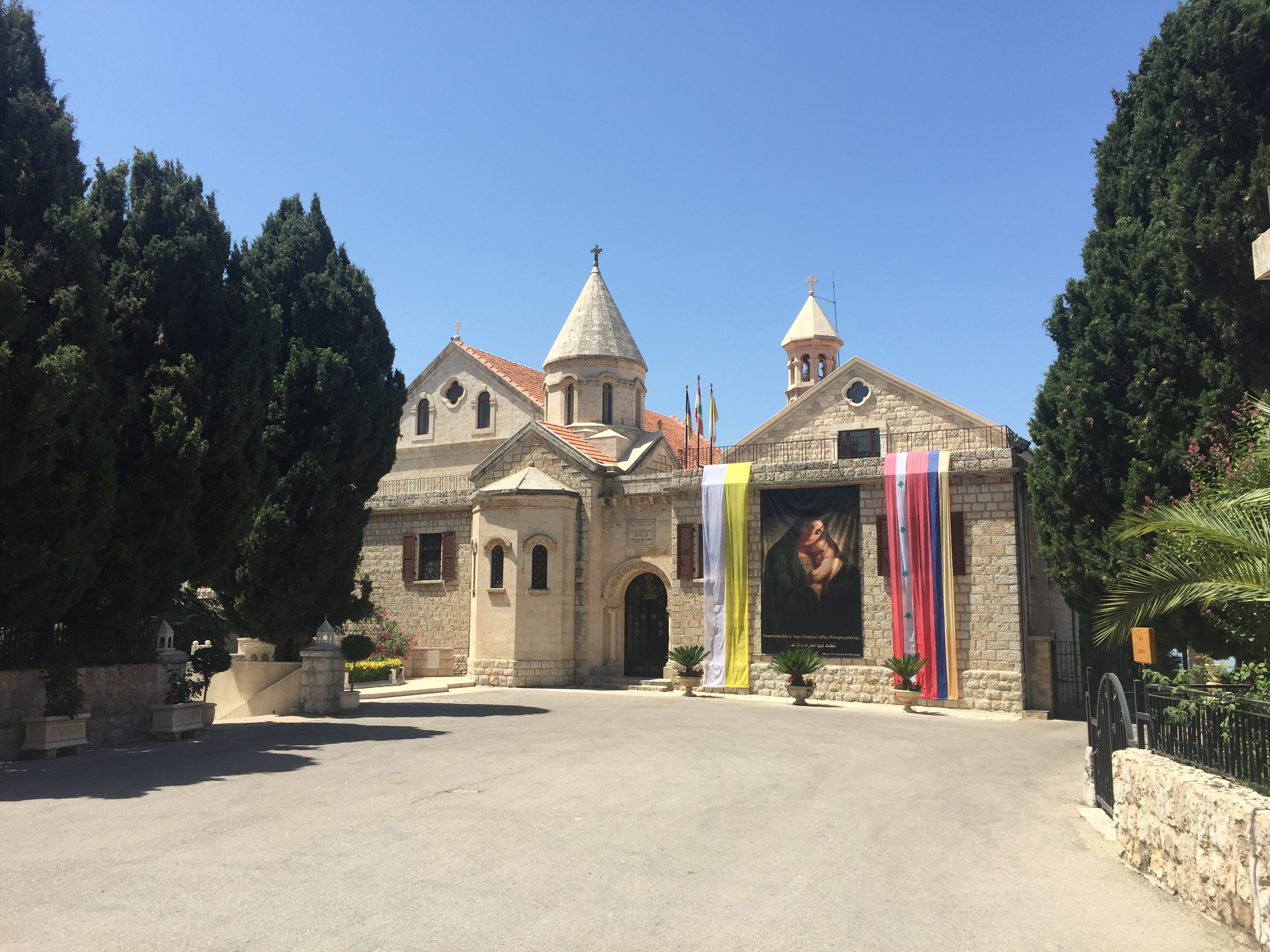
Bzommar Armenian Catholic church in Lebanon

The Patriarchal Congregation of Bzommar (French: Institut du Clergé Patriarcal de Bzommar) is an Armenian Catholic congregation of priests which was founded in 1750. Its members use the initials ICPB after their names.

The congregation was established when the Patriarch of Cilicia, head of the Armenian Catholic Church, established a monastery attached to his cathedral in Bzommar, Lebanon. The men who entered formed a religious community dedicated to the service of the Church, providing spiritual support to the Armenian people. They committed themselves to going wherever in the world they might be sent by the Catholicos, who is ex officio the Superior General of the congregation.

The congregation has provided a number of bishops to the Church during its history. One example is Jean Pierre XVIII Kasparian, who was a member of the congregation and was Patriarch of Cilicia from 1982–1998. Raphaël Bedros XXI Minassian, the current patriarch of the Armenian Catholic Church, is also a member of the congregation.
