= Nerses =

Nerses (Old Armenian: Ներսէս) is an Armenian variant of Narses. With the addition of -ian and -yan, it becomes an Armenian family name like Nersesian and Nersisyan.

Nerses may refer to:

== Given name ==
Catholicoi of the Armenian Apostolic Church

- Saint Nerses I or St. Nerses I, Catholicos of Armenia, also known as Nerses the Great (d. 373)
- Nerses II of Armenia, Catholicos of Armenia (d. 557)
- Nerses III the Builder, Catholicos of Armenia, also known as Nerses the Builder (d. 661)
- Nerses IV the Gracious, Catholicos of Cilicia, also known Nerses the Graceful (d. 1173)
- Nerses V (1770–1857), Catholicos of Armenia

Caucasian Albanian Catholicoi

- Nerses Bakur or Nerses I (died 704)
- Three more catholicoi and one anti-catholicos, see List of Caucasian Albanian Catholicoi

Catholicoi-Patriarchs of the Armenian Catholic Church

- Nerses Bedros XIX Tarmouni (1940–2015), patriarch of the Armenian Catholic Church

Other religious figures

- Nerses Balients, also Nerses Balienc or Nerses Bagh'on, a Christian Armenian monk of the early 14th century
- Nerses of Lambron (1153–1198), Archbishop of Tarsus
- Nerses II Varzhapetian (1837–1884), Armenian Patriarch of Constantinople

Political figures

- Nerses of Iberia, or Nerse of Iberia, 8th-century Georgian prince

Contemporary figures

- Nerses Der Nersessian (1920–2006), Armenian archbishop
- Nerses Hovhannisyan (1938–2016), Armenian director, actor and screenwriter
- Nerses Kamsarakan, 7th-century Armenian king
- Nerses Krikorian (1921–2018), Armenian-American chemist and intelligence officer
- Nerses Ounanian (1924–1957), Uruguayan artist of Armenian descent
- Nerses Pozapalian (1937–2009), Armenian bishop
- Mikail Nersès Sétian (1918–2002), Armenian-American bishop
- Nerses Yeritsyan (born 1971), Armenian minister and public administrator
- Nercesse, Lebanese footballer

== See also ==
- Narses (disambiguation)
- Narsai (disambiguation)
- Nersessian and Nersesyan, surnames derived from the name
- St. Nerses Church, Armenian church in Julfa, Iran
- Church of St. Nerses the Great, located in the town of Martuni in Nagorno-Karabakh
- Surp Nerses Shnorhali Cathedral, Montevideo, Armenian church in Uruguay
- Nersisyan School, Armenian language university in Tiflis, Russian Empire (now Tbilisi, Georgia)
