= Maturana =

Maturana is a surname, and may refer to:

- María Pilar López de Maturana Ortiz de Zárate, Blessed (1884-1984), Spanish Catholic religious and founder of the Mercedarian Missionaries of Bérriz
- Carlos Maturana (born 1953), in art Bororo, Chilean artist
- Eduardo Acevedo Maturana (1815-1863), Uruguayan jurist and politician
- Francisco Maturana (born 1949), Colombian ex-football player and football manager
- Humberto Maturana (1928–2021), Chilean biologist turned philosopher
- Marcos Maturana del Campo (1906-1973), Chilean politician and military
- Marcos Segundo Maturana Molina (1830-1892) Chilean military war hero and art collector
- Nicolás Alexander Maturana Caneo (born 1993), Chilean professional football midfielder
- Orlando Maturana Vargas (born 1965), retired Colombian footballer
- René Gabriel Maturana Maldonado (1955–2009), Chilean journalist and the 36th Mayor of Pichilemu

Religion

- Capilla Maturana in Montevideo, Uruguay
- the adjacent Colegio Maturana, held by the Salesians of Don Bosco, in Montevideo, Uruguay
