= Armenian Catholic Apostolic Exarchate of Latin America and Mexico =

Eastern Catholic missionary jurisdiction in Latin America

Apostolic Exarchate of Latin America and Mexico Americae Latinae una cum Mexico
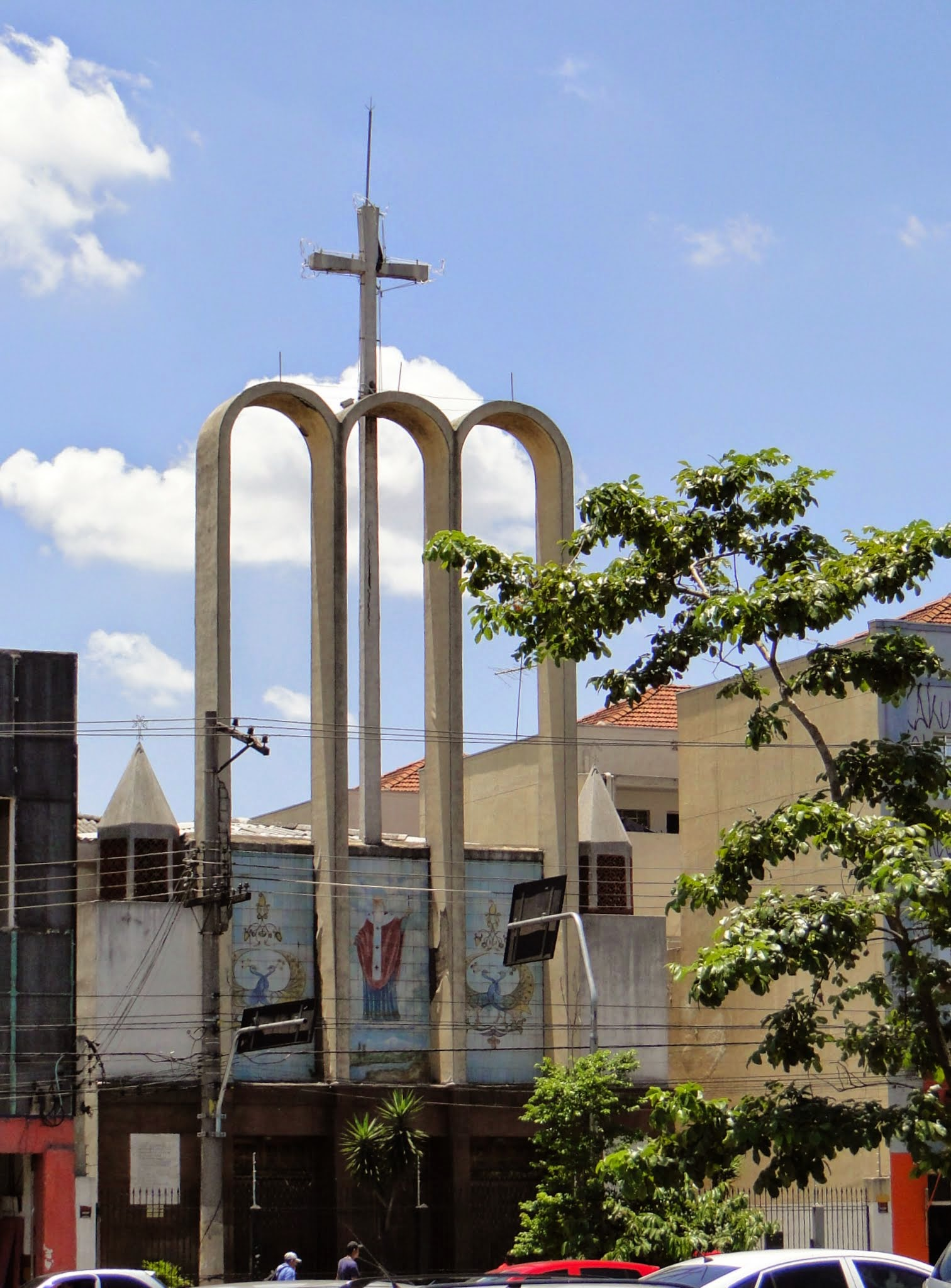
- Armenian Cathedral of St. Gregory the Illuminator in São Paulo

Location
- Country: Brazil, Uruguay, Mexico
- Headquarters: São Paulo, São Paulo, Brazil

Statistics
- Population: (as of 2023); 12,204
- Parishes: 2

Information
- Denomination: Armenian Catholic Church
- Sui iuris church: Armenian Catholic Church
- Rite: Armenian Rite
- Established: 3 July 1981; 45 years ago
- Cathedral: St. Gregory the Illuminator Cathedral, São Paulo
- Co-cathedral: Cathedral of Our Lady of Bzommar
- Patron saint: Gregory the Illuminator
- Secular priests: 2 Religious Orders
- Language: Armenian language

Current leadership
- Pope: Leo XIV
- Patriarch: Raphaël Bedros XXI Minassian, I.C.P.B.
- Apostolic Exarch: Sede vacante
- Apostolic Administrator: Odilo Scherer; Daniel Sturla, S.D.B.

The Armenian Catholic Apostolic Exarchate of Latin America and Mexico (América Latina e México) is a pre-diocesan missionary jurisdiction of the Armenian Catholic Church sui iuris (Armenian Rite in Armenian language) in parts of Latin America. It is exempt, i.e. directly dependent on Rome (notably the Roman Congregation for the Oriental Churches), not part of any ecclesiastical province.

It has a cathedral episcopal: Catedral Armênia São Gregório Iluminador, São Paulo, Brazil and a Co-cathedral: Nuestra Señora de Bzommar, Montevideo, Uruguay.

== History ==
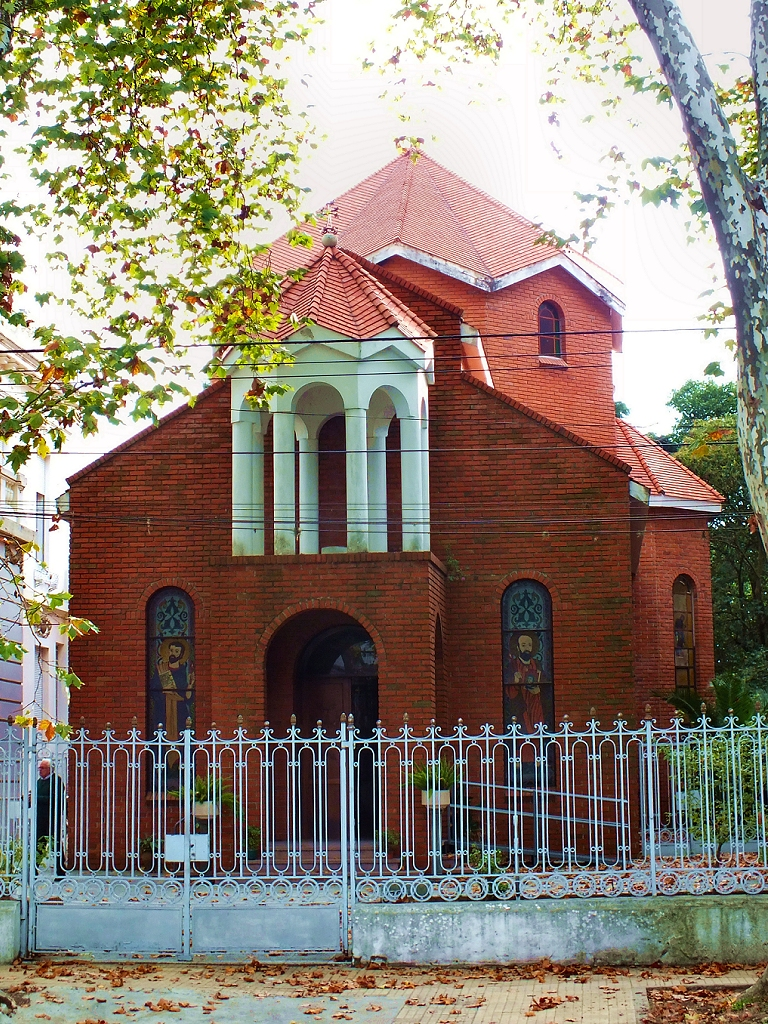
Armenian Catholic Cathedral of Our Lady of Bzommar, Prado, Montevideo, Uruguay.

- Established on 3 July 1981 as Apostolic Exarchate of Latin America and Mexico, on territory previously without Ordinary of the particular church.
- The Eparchy of San Gregorio de Narek en Buenos Aires in Argentina was established on 18 February 1989, leaving the Armenian Catholic Apostolic Exarchate of Latin America and Mexico responsible for Armenian Catholics in Brazil, Uruguay and Mexico.

== Ordinaries ==
(all Armenian Rite)

Apostolic Exarchs of Latin America and Mexico (América Latina e México)

- Vartan Waldir Boghossian, S.D.B. (3 July 1981 – 4 July 2018) retired
- Pablo León Hakimian (4 July 2018 – 6 November 2024)
  - Apostolic Administrator Vartan Waldir Boghossian, S.D.B. (31 March 2025 – 2 March 2026), Bishop Emeritus of San Gregorio de Narek en Buenos Aires, Apostolic Exarch Emeritus of Latin America and Mexico
  - Apostolic Administrators (2 March 2026 – Present)
    - Odilo Scherer, Archbishop of São Paulo
    - Daniel Sturla, Archbishop of Montevideo

== See also ==
- Catholic Church in Armenia
- Catholic Church in Latin America
