= Armenian Martyrs Memorial =

Armenian genocide memorial in Montevideo

Coordinates: 34.87789666170668°S 56.19635194767141°W

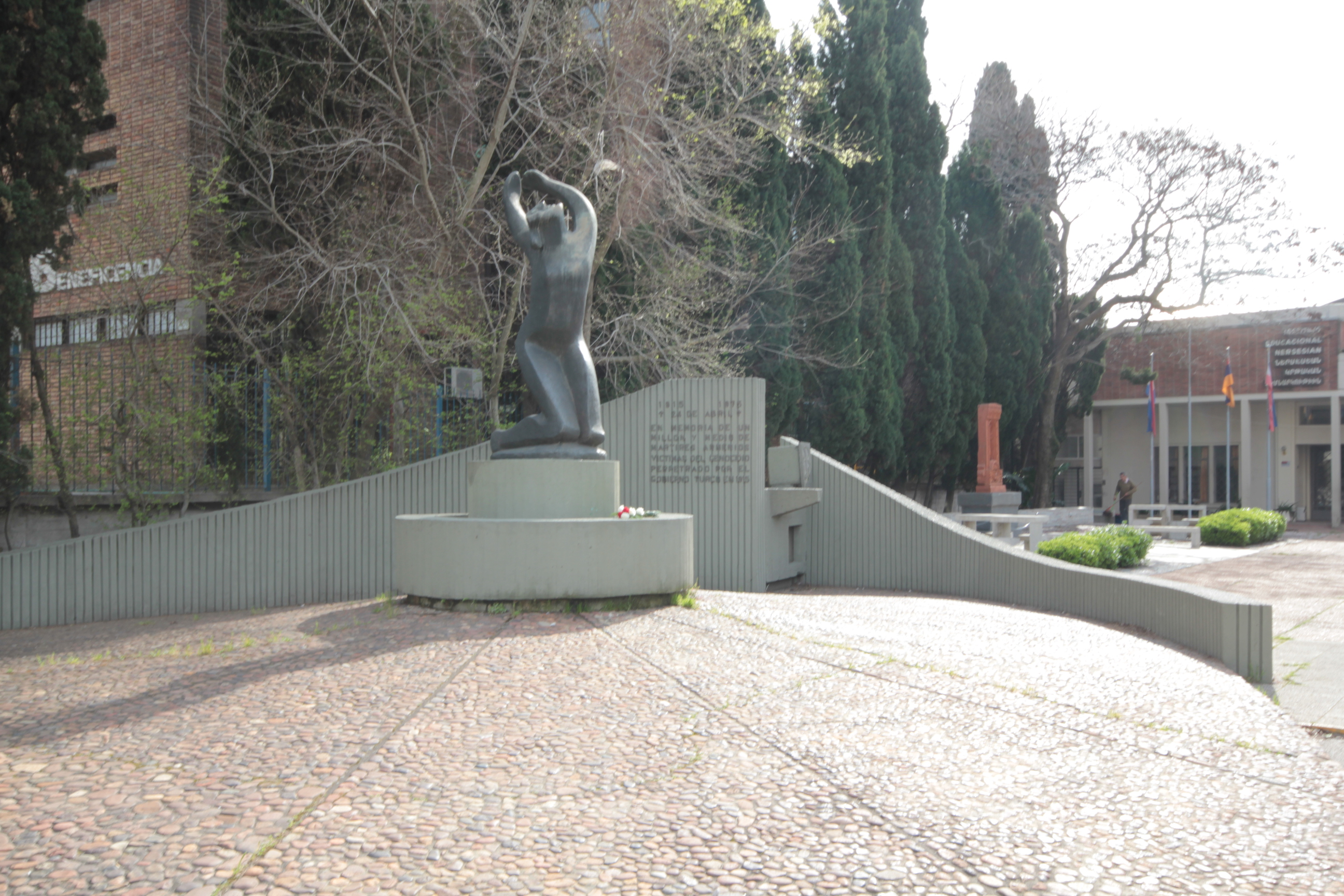
Memorial to the Armenian Genocide, Montevideo, with sculpture by Nerses Ounanian.

The Armenian Martyrs Memorial (Spanish: Monumento a los Mártires Armenios) is located at the neighbourhood of Bella Vista, Montevideo, Uruguay. It is adjacent to the Surp Nerses Shnorhali Cathedral and the Nubarian school. Its main piece is a statue by Nerses Ounanian. Erected on April 24, 1975, it is dedicated to the memory of the victims of the Armenian Genocide. Its construction was funded by the Armenian community of Montevideo.

== See also ==
- Armenian Uruguayans
- List of Armenian genocide memorials
- Armenian genocide
