= Narsai (disambiguation) =

Narsai (died c. 502) was Syriac poet-theologian.

Narsai (Classical Syriac: ܢܪܣܝ) may also refer to:

== People ==
- Narsai of Adiabene, 2nd-century Parthian client king of Adiabene
- Narsai (Nestorian patriarch), Patriarch of the Church of the East
- Narsai David (born 1936), author, radio and television personality in the Bay Area, USA
- Narsai Shaba, an ethnic Assyrian professional footballer who was transferred to the Swedish football club Assyriska FF in 2011
- Narsai Toma (1941–2014), Metropolitan of the Ancient Church of the East

== Writings ==
- Acts of Narsai, a hagiographical text composed in the middle of the 5th century

== See also ==
- Narseh (died 302)
- Narses (disambiguation)
- Nerses (disambiguation)
