= Roberto Markarian =

Roberto Markarian Abrahamian (12 December 1946) is a Uruguayan mathematician of Armenian descent, expert in dynamical systems and chaos theory.

== Biography ==
He started studying at the University of the Republic in the 1960s. During the civic-military dictatorship he was arrested due to political reasons. Later he went to Brazil, where he graduated from the Federal University of Rio Grande do Sul. Later on, his degree was validated in Uruguay.

Markarian served as rector of the University of the Republic (2014-2018).

He is brother of the football coach Sergio Markarián.
