= Narses (disambiguation) =

Narses (478-573) was a general under the Emperor Justinian I who led the reconquest of Italy.

Narses may also refer to:

- Narses (comes), also general of Justinian I and brother of Aratius
- Narses (magister militum per Orientem), a general under the Emperor Maurice at the end of the sixth century

== See also ==
- Narsai (disambiguation)
- Narseh, a Sassanid King of Persia
- Narseh, the Zoroastrian messenger god
- Narsieh, son of Prince Peroz and grandson of Yazdgerd III, the last king of the Sassanid empire
- Nerse of Iberia or Nerses of Iberia, 8th-century Georgian prince
- Nerses (disambiguation)
