= Juana de Ibarbourou =

Uruguayan poet

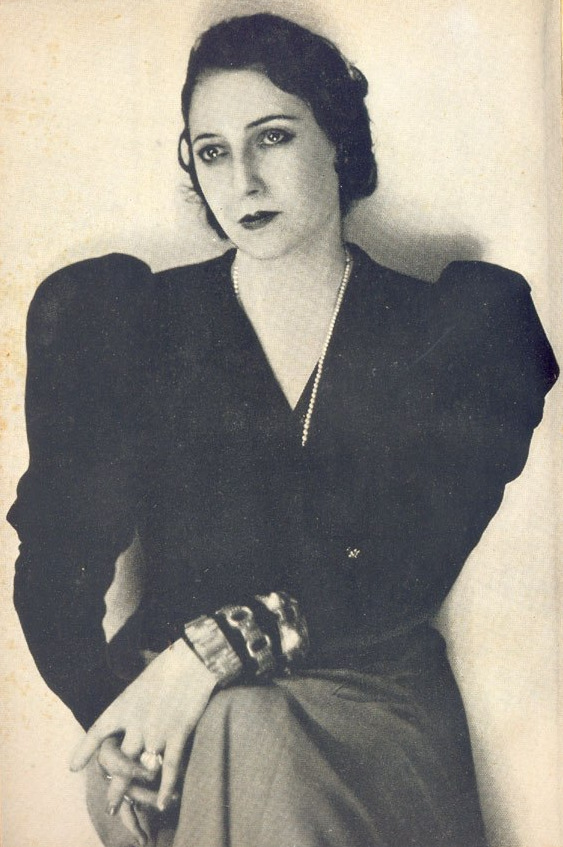
- Born: Juana Fernández Morales; March 8, 1892; Melo, Uruguay
- Died: July 15, 1979 (aged 87); Montevideo, Uruguay
- Occupation: Writer
- Spouse: Lucas Ibarbourou
- Children: Julio César

Juana Fernández Morales de Ibarbourou, also known as Juana de América, (March 8, 1892 – July 15, 1979) was a Uruguayan poet and one of the most popular writers of Spanish America. Her poetry, the earliest of which is often highly erotic, is notable for her identification of her feelings with nature around her. She was nominated for the Nobel Prize in Literature in 1959, 1960 and 1963.

== Biography ==
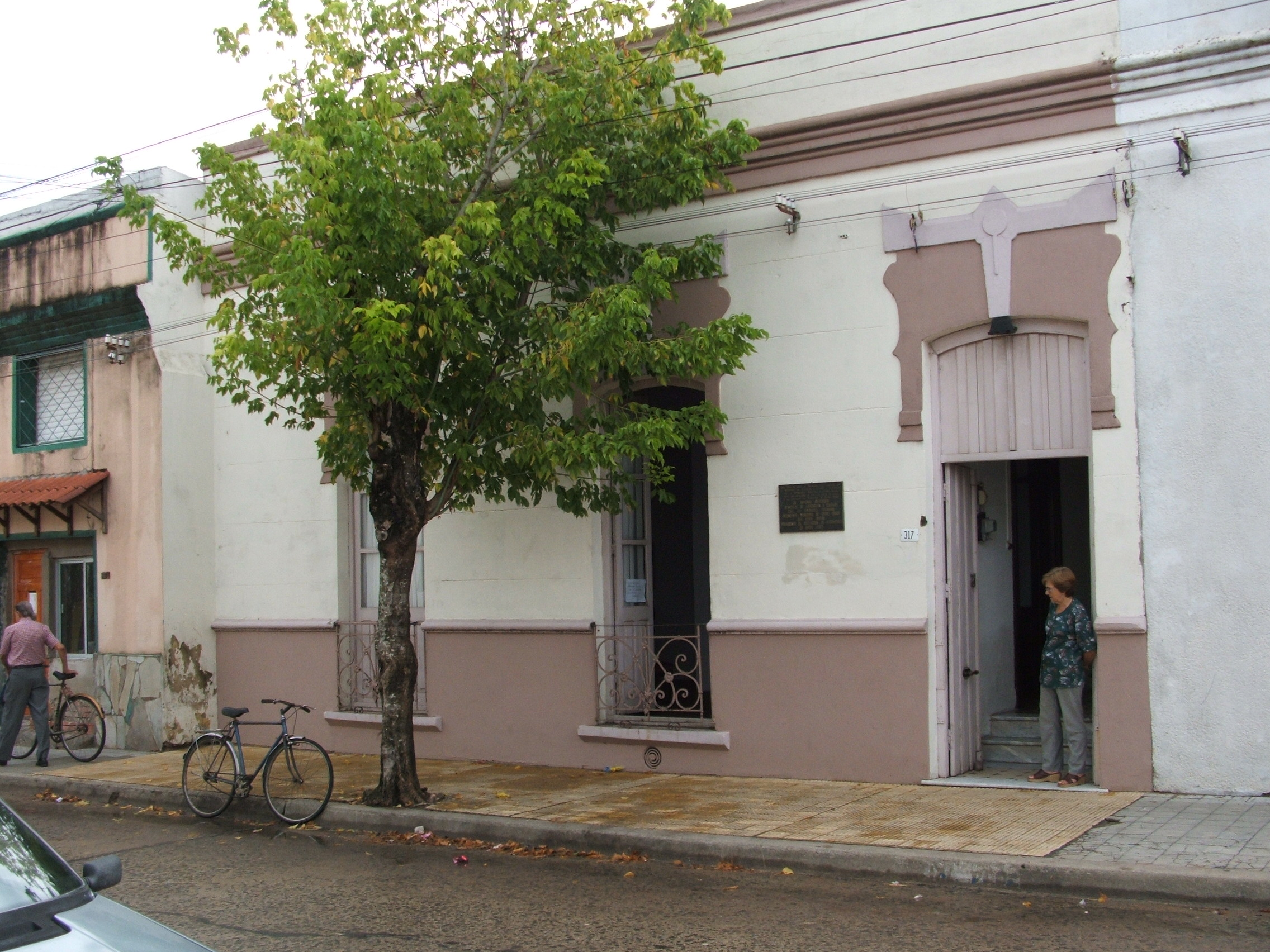
Juana's birthplace

She was born Juana Fernández Morales on March 8, 1892, in Melo, Cerro Largo, Uruguay. The date of Juana's birth is often given as March 8, 1895, but according to a local state civil registry signed by two witnesses, the year was actually 1892. Juana began studies at the José Pedro Varela school in 1899 and moved to a religious school the following year, and two public schools afterwards. In 1909, when she was 17 years old, she published a prose piece, "Derechos femeninos" (women's rights), beginning a lifelong career as a prominent feminist.

She married Captain Lucas Ibarbourou Trillo (1879-1942) in a civil ceremony June 28, 1913, and had one child named Julio César Ibarbourou Fernández (1914-1988). In 1918, Juana moved to Montevideo with her family. As was the custom, Juana and Lucas were remarried in a religious ceremony on June 28, 1921, in the Church of Our Lady of Perpetual Aid. Lucas Ibarbourou died on January 13, 1942. Their son Julio became a compulsive gambler and drug addict and Juana spent nearly all of her money, eventually having to sell her houses, property and jewelry, to pay his debts and the costs of his medical care.

Juana de Ibarbourou died on July 15, 1979, in Montevideo, Uruguay.

Some of her poems were set to music for voice & piano by Indonesian composer Ananda Sukarlan and now belongs to the repertoire of the genre art song, sung by many classical music vocalists.

== Poetry and philosophy ==
Juana de Ibarbourou was a feminist, naturalist, and pantheist.

=== Feminism ===
Juana de Ibarbourou was an early Latin American feminist. Ibarbourou's feminism is evident in poems such as "La Higuera", in which she describes a fig tree as more beautiful than the straight and blooming trees around it, and "Como La Primavera", in which she asserts that authenticity is more attractive than any perfume. Also, in "La Cita", Ibarbourou extols her naked form devoid of traditional ornamentation, comparing her natural features to various material accessories and finding in favor of her unadorned body.

=== Common themes ===
Nature imagery and eroticism define a great body of Ibarbourou's poetry.

=== Death ===
Ibarbourou's depiction of death in her poetry was not consistent throughout her body of work. In "La Inquietud Fugaz", Ibarbourou portrayed a binary, final death consistent with Western tradition. In "Vida-Garfio" and "Carne Inmortal", however, Ibarbourou describes her dead body giving rise to plant life, allowing her to live on.

In "Rebelde", one of her most richly constructed poems, Ibarbourou details a confrontation between herself and Charon, the ferryman of the River Styx. Surrounded by wailing souls on the boat passage to the underworld, Ibarbourou defiantly refuses to lament her fate, acting as cheerfully as a sparrow. Although Ibarbourou does not escape her fate, she wins a moral victory against the forces of death.

Like most poets, Ibarbourou nursed an intense fear of death. Though it is easy to surmise this from her poetry, she states so explicitly in the first line of "Carne Inmortal."

== Published works ==
- Lenguas de diamante (1919)
- Raiz salvaje (1920)
- La rosa de los vientos (1930)
- Oro y tormenta (1956), biblical themes reflect her preoccupation with suffering and death.
- Chico Carlo (1944) contains her memoirs.
- Obras Completas (3rd ed. 1968).

== Awards and honors ==
- Medal of Public Instruction of Venezuela (1927)
- Consecrated "Juana de América" in the Salon of the Lost Steps of the Legislative Palace of Montevideo (1929)
- Gold Medal of Francisco Pizarro (Peru, 1935)
- Order of the Condor of the Andes (Bolivia, 1937)
- Order of the Sun (Peru, 1938)
- President of the PEN Club of Uruguay (1941)
- Order of the Southern Cross (Brazil, 1945) (Ordem do Cruzeiro do Sul)
- Cross of the Commander of the Grand Humanitarian Prize of Belgium (1946)
- National Academy of Letters (Uruguay, 1947)
- Gold Medal from the Ministry of Public Instruction (Uruguay, 1948)
- Carlos Manuel Céspedes Order (Cuba, 1951)
- Named "Woman of the Americas" by the American Women's Union of New York (1953)
- Eloy Alfaro Order (Ecuador, 1953)
- National Grand Prize for Literature (Uruguay, 1959)
- Order of the Quetzal (Guatemala, 1960)
- Plaza in La Paz, Bolivia named for Juana de Ibarbourou (1965)
- Branch of the Juana de Ibarbourou Library and House of Culture opened in home town of Melo (1977)
- La Fiesta de los Milagros (1943)

== Museums ==
In Melo, capital city of Cerro Largo Department, there are two museums that display her life:

- Juana de Ibarbourou's birthplace
- Regional History Museum

== Works cited ==
- Sylvia Puentes de Oyenard. "Apuntes para una Biobibliografia de Juana de Ibarbourou." Foreword. Obras Escogidas. By Juana de Ibarbourou, ed. Sylvia Puentes de Oyenard. México, D.F.: Editorial Andres Bello, 1998.
