= Cathedral of Our Lady of Bzommar =

Church in Montevideo, Uruguay

Coordinates: 34°52′6.5″S 56°12′17.2″W

Catedral de Nuestra Señora de Bzommar
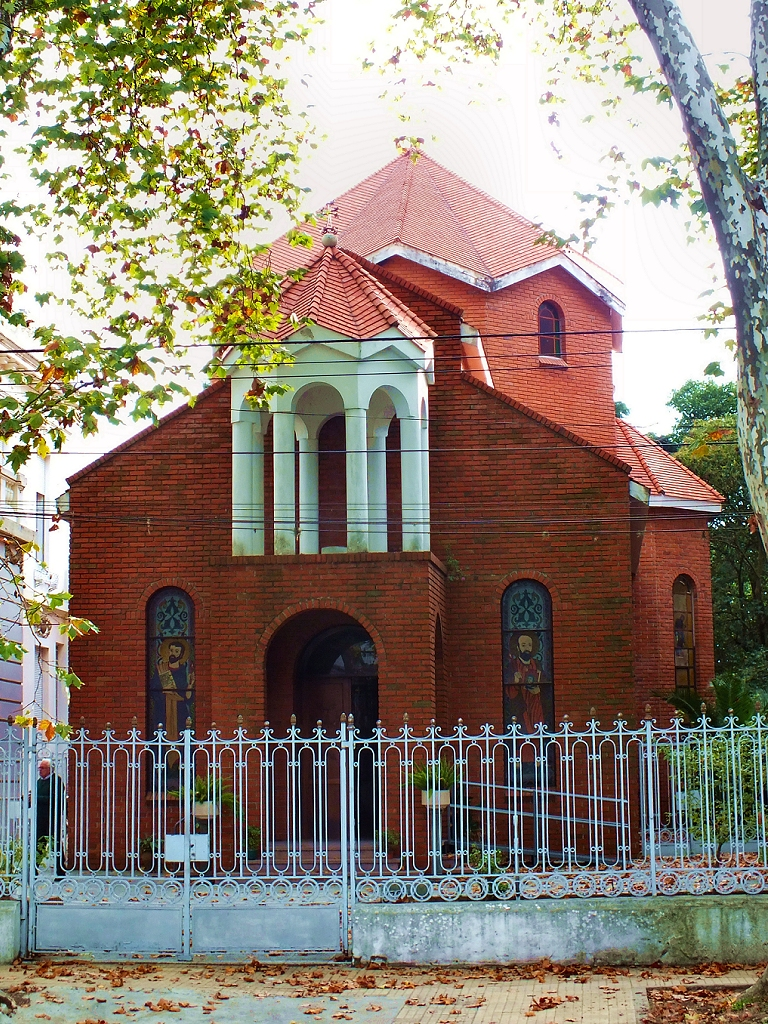

Religion
- Affiliation: Armenian Catholic
- Ecclesiastical or organisational status: Cathedral

Location
- Location: Av. 19 de Abril 3325; Prado, Montevideo, Uruguay
- Interactive map of Catedral de Nuestra Señora de Bzommar

Architecture
- Style: Armenian

The Cathedral of Our Lady of Bzommar (Spanish: Catedral Católica Armenia Nuestra Señora de Bzommar) is the cathedral church of the Armenian Catholic Church in Prado (Montevideo), Uruguay as Co-cathedral of Armenian Catholic Apostolic Exarchate of Latin America and Mexico.

The temple is dedicated to Our Lady of Bzommar, the patron of Armenian Catholics. It is a significant religious center for the local Armenian community.

== Same devotion ==
There is another church in Montevideo dedicated to Our Lady of Bzommar: the Parish Church of Our Lady of Bzommar in La Comercial.

== See also ==
- Catholic Church in Uruguay
- List of cathedrals in Uruguay
- Surp Nerses Shnorhali Cathedral
- Armenians in Uruguay
- Armenian Catholic Apostolic Exarchate of Latin America and Mexico
