= Armenian Catholic Eparchy of San Gregorio de Narek en Buenos Aires =

Eastern Catholic eparchy in Argentina

Eparchy of San Gregorio de Narek en Buenos Aires Eparchia Sancti Gregorii Narekiani Bonaërensis Armenorum Սուրբ Գրիգոր Նարեկացի առաջնորդություն Բուենոս Այրեսում
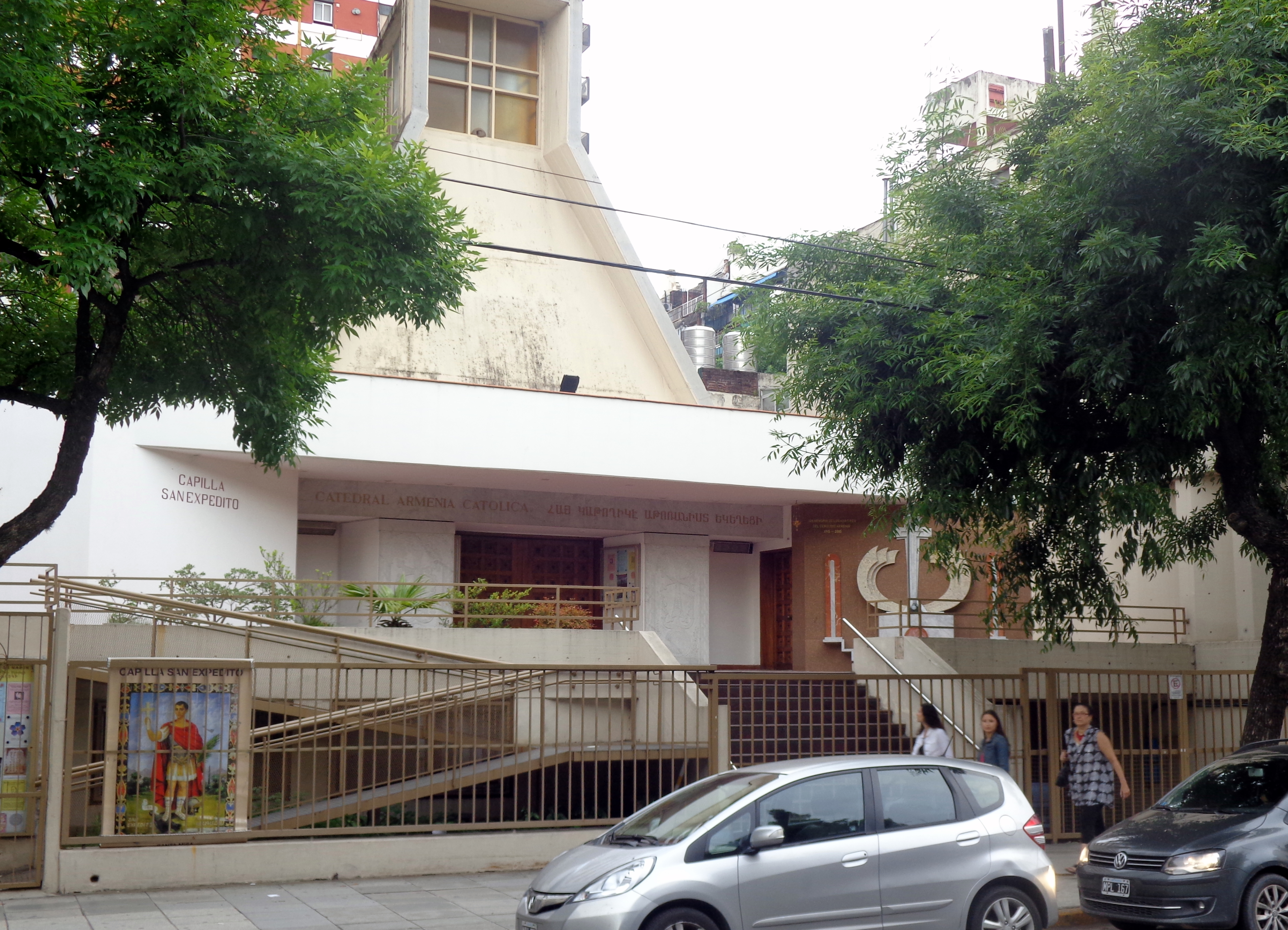
- Our Lady of Narek Cathedral

Location
- Country: Argentina
- Headquarters: Buenos Aires, Argentina

Statistics
- Population: (as of 2023); 16,900
- Parishes: 1

Information
- Denomination: Armenian Catholic Church
- Sui iuris church: Armenian Catholic Church
- Rite: Armenian Rite
- Established: 18 February 1989; 37 years ago
- Cathedral: Our Lady of Narek Cathedral, Buenos Aires

Current leadership
- Pope: Leo XIV
- Patriarch: Raphaël Bedros XXI Minassian, I.C.P.B.
- Bishop: Sede vacante
- Apostolic Administrator: Jorge Ignacio García Cuerva
- Bishops emeritus: Vartan Waldir Boghossian, S.D.B.

The Armenian Catholic Eparchy of San Gregorio de Narek en Buenos Aires (Latin: Eparchia Sancti Gregorii Narekiani Bonaërensis Armenorum) is an eparchy (Eastern Catholic diocese) of the Armenian Catholic Church (Armenian Rite in Armenian language) for Argentina.

It depends immediately on the Armenian Catholic Patriarch of Cilicia, without being part of his or any other ecclesiastical province.

Its Cathedral episcopal see is the Marian Catedral Armenia de Nuestra Señora de Narek, in Argentina's capital Buenos Aires, dedicated to Our Lady of Nareg.

== History ==
Established on 18 February 1989 as Eparchy of San Gregorio de Narek en (i.e. 'in') Buenos Aires, on territory split off from the Armenian Catholic Apostolic Exarchate of Latin America and Mexico, from where the Apostolic Exarch was promoted as first Eparch in Buenos Aires.

== Bishops ==
=== Episcopal ordinaries ===
(all Armenian Rite)

Eparchial Bishops of (San Gregorio de Narek in) Buenos Aires

- Vartan Waldir Boghossian, S.D.B. (18 February 1989 – 4 July 2018), retired
- Pablo León Hakimian (4 July 2018 – 6 November 2024)
  - Apostolic Administrator Vartan Waldir Boghossian, S.D.B. (31 March 2025 – 2 March 2026), Eparch Emeritus of San Gregorio de Narek en Buenos Aires
  - Apostolic Administrator Jorge Ignacio García Cuerva (2 March 2026 – Present), Archbishop of Buenos Aires

=== Auxiliary bishop ===
- Joseph Arnaouti, I.C.P.B. (1994-1997), appointed Curial Bishop of Cilicia

== See also ==
- Catholic Church in Argentina
