= Vartan Waldir Boghossian =

Brazilian Armenian Catholic bishop (born 1940)

The Most Reverend Vartán Waldir Boghossian S.D.B.
- Bishop Emeritus of San Gregorio de Narek en Buenos Aires
- Church: Armenian Catholic Church
- See: Apostolic Exarch of the Latin America and Mexico, San Gregorio de Narek en Buenos Aires
- Appointed: 3 July 1981 (as Ap. Exarch); 18 February 1989 (as Bishop)
- Term ended: 4 July 2018
- Predecessor: See established
- Successor: Pablo León Hakimian
- Other posts: Apostolic Administrator of San Gregorio de Narek en Buenos Aires and Latin America and Mexico (2025–2026)

Orders
- Ordination: 22 December 1966
- Consecration: 12 December 1981 by Hemaiag Bedros XVII Ghedighian

Personal details
- Born: Vartán Waldir Boghossian; 27 February 1940 (age 86) Penápolis, Brazil
- Education: Pontifical Salesian University

Vartán Waldir Boghossian S.D.B. (born 27 February 1940) is a Brazilian Armenian Catholic hierarch. He served as the first Eparch of the Armenian Catholic Eparchy of San Gregorio de Narek en Buenos Aires (1989–2018) and the Apostolic Exarch of the Armenian Catholic Apostolic Exarchate of Latin America and Mexico (1981–2018) for nearly four decades.

== Early life and education ==
Vartán Waldir Boghossian was born in Penápolis, São Paulo, Brazil. He joined the Salesians of Don Bosco and pursued his philosophical and theological studies at the Pontifical Salesian University in Rome, where he was ordained a priest on 22 December 1966.

== Episcopal ministry ==
On 3 July 1981, he was appointed by Pope John Paul II as the Apostolic Exarch for the Armenian Catholic Apostolic Exarchate of Latin America and Mexico and Titular Bishop of Amida of the Armenians. He received his episcopal consecration on 12 December 1981 from Patriarch Hemaiag Bedros XVII Ghedighian. When the Armenian Catholic Eparchy of San Gregorio de Narek en Buenos Aires was established on 18 February 1989, he became its first Eparch.

In 2010, Boghossian participated in the Special Assembly for the Middle East of the Synod of Bishops, where he highlighted the unique challenges of the Armenian diaspora in South America, particularly the need for pastoral care for those living far from established parish centers.

=== Retirement and late ministry ===
Pope Francis accepted his resignation from the pastoral governance of the eparchy on 4 July 2018, appointing Pablo León Hakimian as his successor. However, following the death of Bishop Hakimian in late 2024, Boghossian returned to active administration, and on 31 March 2025, he was appointed as the Apostolic Administrator sede vacante of both the Eparchy of San Gregorio de Narek in Buenos Aires and the Apostolic Exarchate of Latin America and Mexico. He served in this capacity until 2 March 2026, when resigned from these two circumscriptions.

== Honors and recognition ==
Boghossian has received numerous accolades for his service to the Church and the Armenian community:

- In 2015, he was awarded the title of "Filho Ilustre" (Illustrious Son) by the city of Penápolis.
- In 2025, he was honored with the title of Doctor Honoris Causa from the Unisalesiano, Brazil, for his humanitarian and religious contributions.
