= Mount Ararat Square (Buenos Aires) =

Square in Buenos Aires, Argentina

Coordinates: 34.5894763°S 58.4154385°W

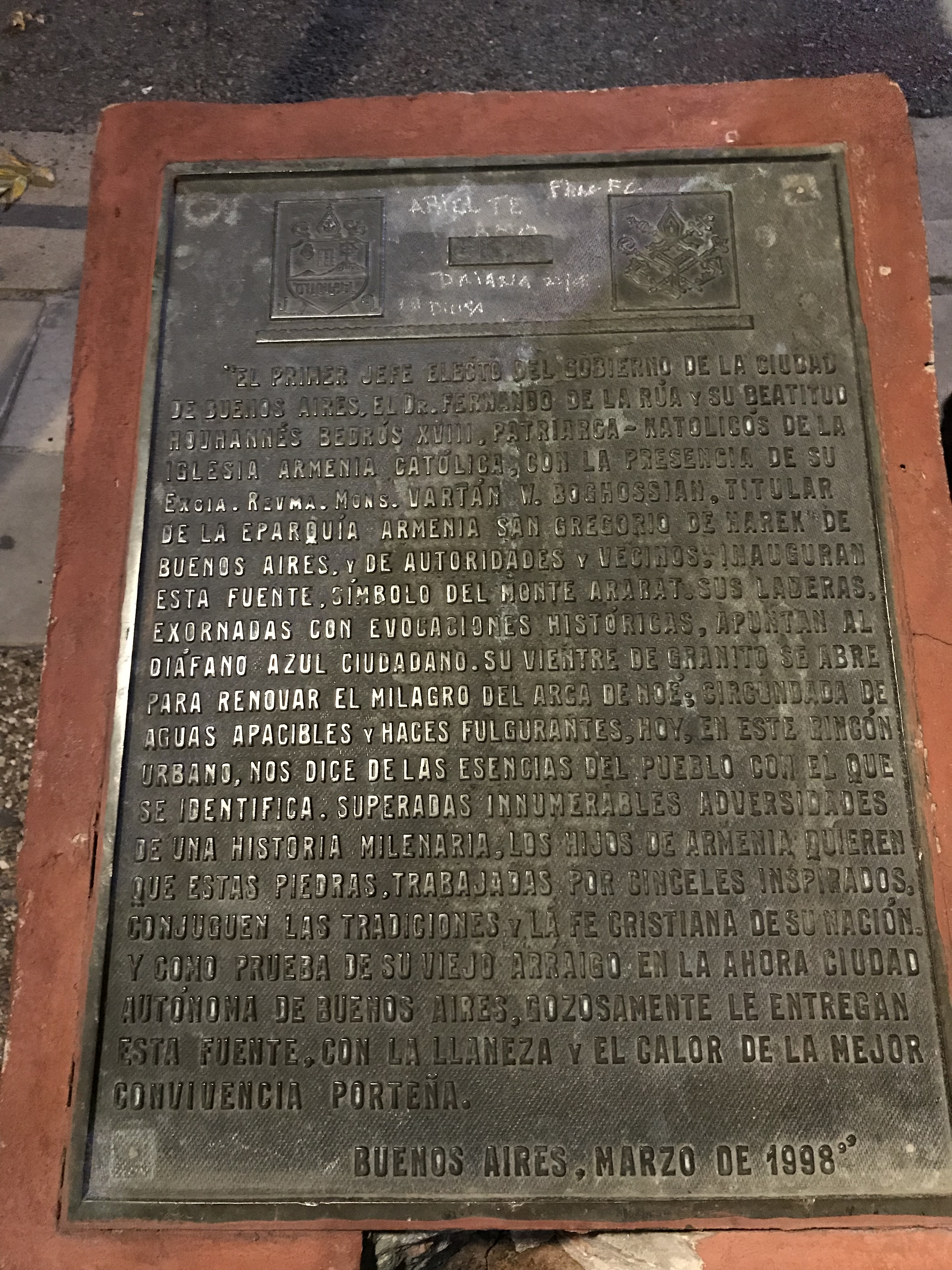
Commemorative plaque

Mount Ararat Square (Spanish: Plazoleta Monte Ararat) is a small park situated in the neighbourhood of Palermo, Buenos Aires.

Dedicated to the Armenian community in Argentina, the square was placed in 1983, two years after the consecration of the Armenian Cathedral of Our Lady of Narek, lying just across of Mount Ararat square, on Charcas Street.

Since its inauguration in March 1998, a monumental fountain sits on its northwestern tip, facing Jerónimo Salguero Street, composed by six triangular, marble-faced, red ochre granite slabs, said on the accompanying bronze plaque to represent Mount Ararat, but in disposition somewhat resembling the Tsitsernakaberd memorial in Yerevan. Some sources claim that this monument is indeed a replica of the Tsitsernakaberd of Yerevan. The Spanish text of the dedication bronze plaque itself proclaims that the monument was made to allegorise Mount Ararat, and some of the sources indicate this as well.

The initiative towards the erection of this monument came in 1988 from the Senator for the Federal District Fernando de la Rúa (Unión Cívica Radical), though the draft law expired before being treated in Congress. As Chief of Government of the City of Buenos Aires, in 1998, De la Rúa - who was to become President of Argentina on the next year - proceeded to realise this belated project of his, inaugurating the square's fountain with the presence of Hovhannes Bedros XVIII, the Armenian Catholic Catolicos-Patriarch of Cilicia, and Vartán Waldir Boghossian, the Catholic Bishop for the Eparchy of the Armenians of Saint Gregory of Narek in Buenos Aires, and the attendance of notables and residents of the neighbourhood.
