= Capurro =

Capurro–Bella Vista
- Barrio
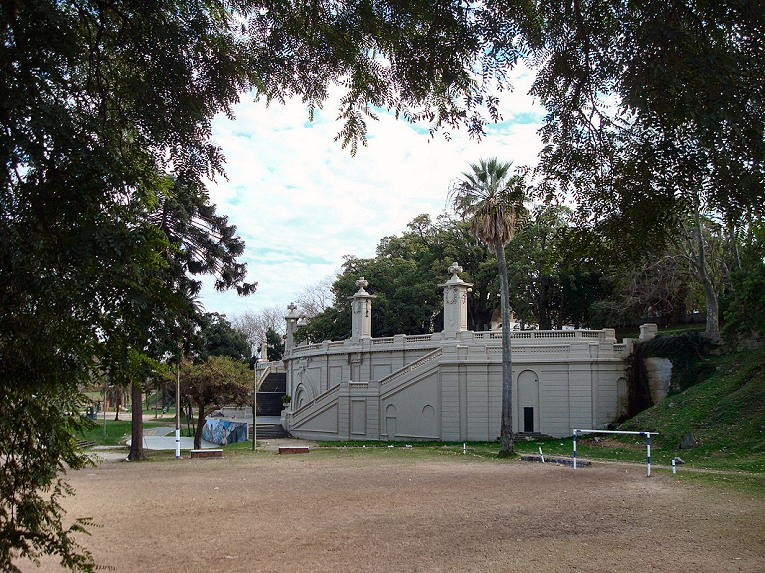
- Parque Capurro

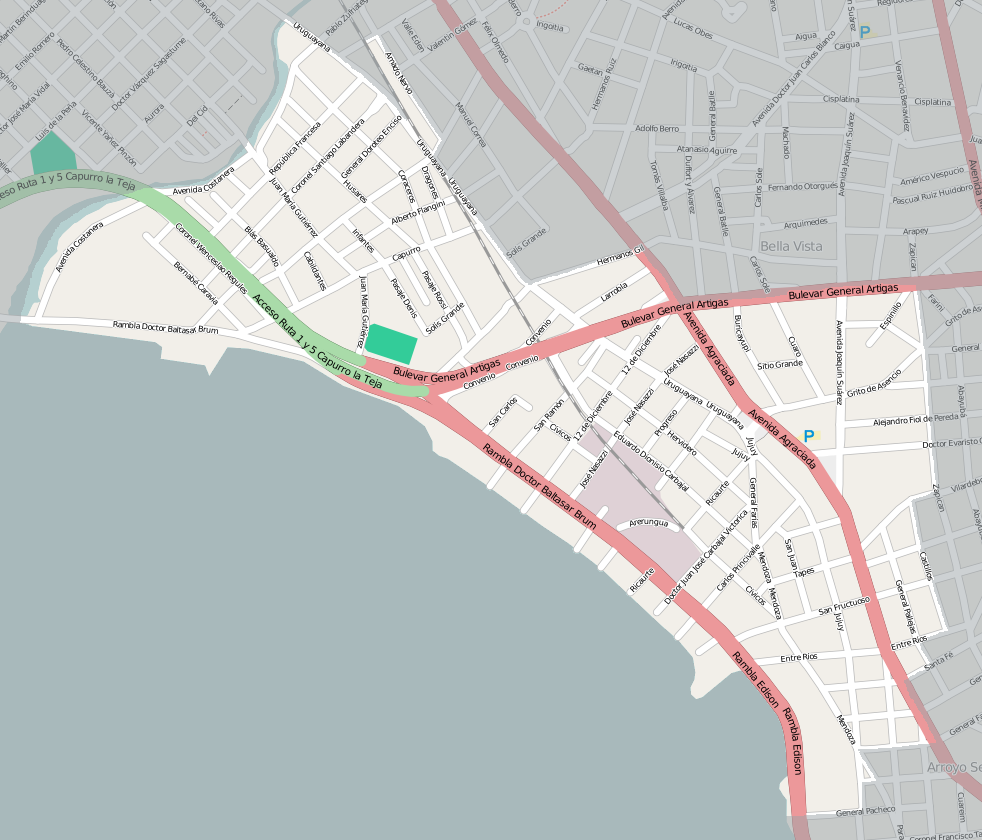
- Street map of Capurro–Bella Vista

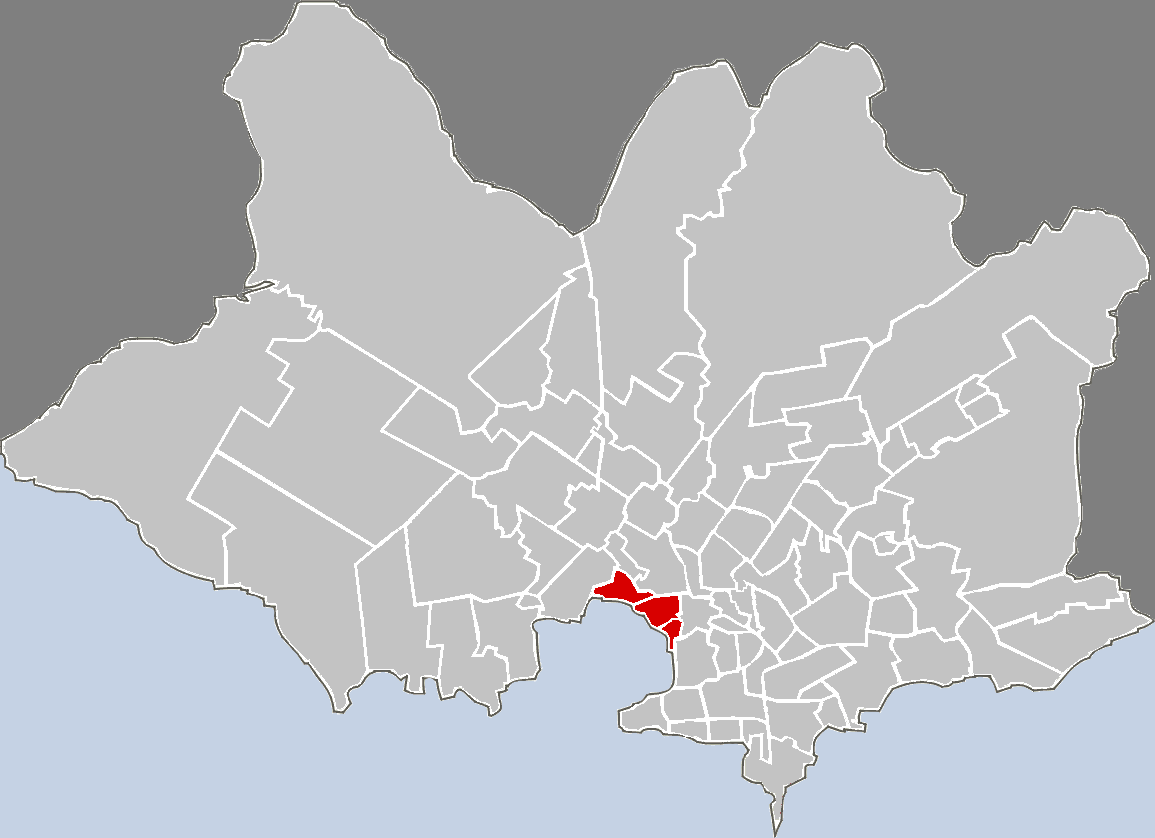
- Location of Capurro–Bella Vista in Montevideo
- Coordinates: 34°52′11″S 56°12′41″W
- Country: Uruguay
- Department: Montevideo Department
- City: Montevideo

Capurro is a barrio (neighbourhood or district) of Montevideo, Uruguay, and part of the Capurro–Bella Vista composite barrio, with Artigas Boulevard separating the two.

== Location ==
Capurro shares borders with La Teja to the northwest, Prado to the northeast, Bella Vista to the southeast and it borders the Bay of Montevideo to the southwest.

== History ==
The early history of the area was marked by the trade of slaves from Africa. Slave trading ships had first arrived in Montevideo in 1743. The Spanish company Real Compañía de Filipinas, after its first such import in 1787, was forced by the government to build quaranteen barracks for the slaves, for the protection from epidemic diseases. These barracks, that came to be known as "Caserío de los Negros", were built in the coast of Capurro. After the declaration of Independence, they were demolished.

The name and foundation of Capurro are related to the Genoan mariner Giovanni Battista Capurro. He arrived in the country at the time of the first Constitution and acquired coastal land in this area around 1830. His home, which was surrounded by wonderful gardens, took on the name "Mecca". The area he acquired was rich in springs and wells of fresh water and had a lot of sand. Capurro started selling fresh water to ships returning to Europe, as well as sand for ballast, causing the sand of the beach to dwindle away.

In 1869, the "Compañía de Tranvías al Paso del Molino y Cerro" established a line of horsecars which connected Montevideo with the Villa del Cerro. This line brought many visitors to the area around the beach, which was called Playa Honda, transforming it into a relaxation and recreation area. The sons of Capurro started planning to build a big hotel, but the economic crisis of the 1890s stopped their plans. Instead, in 1910, a park was founded in its place, called Parque Capurro. It was designed by the Italian architect Giovanni Veltroni.

== See also ==
- Barrios of Montevideo
