= Nersesyan =

Nersesyan or Nersesian (Armenian: Ներսիսյան) is an Armenian surname. Notable people with the surname include:

- Anahit Nersesyan (born 1954), Armenian classical pianist
- Arthur Nersesian, American writer, playwright and poet
- Sebouh Nersesian (1872–1940), Armenian general
- Anry Nersessian (born 1936), Armenian mathematician

== See also ==
- Nerses (disambiguation)
