= Nuestra Señora del Perpetuo Socorro y San Alfonso, Montevideo =

Roman Catholic parish church in Montevideo, Uruguay

Coordinates: 34°52′49″S 56°11′52″W

Iglesia de Nuestra Señora del Perpetuo Socorro y San Alfonso
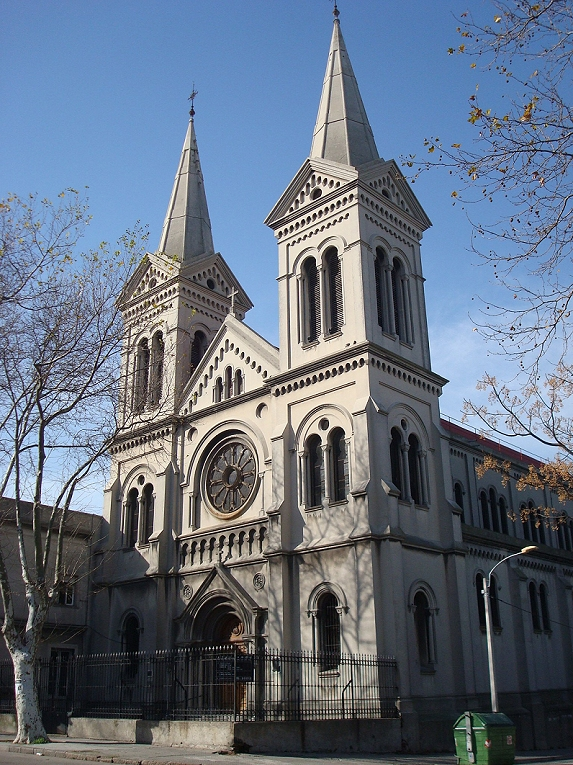

Religion
- Affiliation: Roman Catholic
- Ecclesiastical or organizational status: Parish church
- Year consecrated: 1899

Location
- Location: Tapes 956; Montevideo, Uruguay
- Interactive map of Iglesia de Nuestra Señora del Perpetuo Socorro y San Alfonso

Architecture
- Type: Church
- Style: Neo-Romanesque

Specifications
- Length: 47 m
- Width (nave): 19 m
- Spire: 2
- Spire height: 40 m

The Church of Our Lady of Perpetual Help and St. Alphonsus (Spanish: Iglesia de Nuestra Señora del Perpetuo Socorro y San Alfonso), popularly known as Iglesia de Tapes (due to its location on the Tapes Street, in the neighbourhood of Bella Vista) is a Roman Catholic parish church in Montevideo, Uruguay.

== History ==
The church was built between 1896 and 1899 in Neo-Romanesque style, inspired by a German church from Aachen.

It is dedicated to Our Lady of Perpetual Help and saint Alphonsus.

Inside there is a wonderful Walcker organ from 1927.

The parish was established on 17 November 1955.

The wedding of Juana de Ibarbourou, the most famous Uruguayan poetess, was held there in 1921.
