= St. Gregory the Illuminator Cathedral, São Paulo =

St. Gregory the Illuminator Cathedral
- Catedral Armênia São Gregório Iluminador
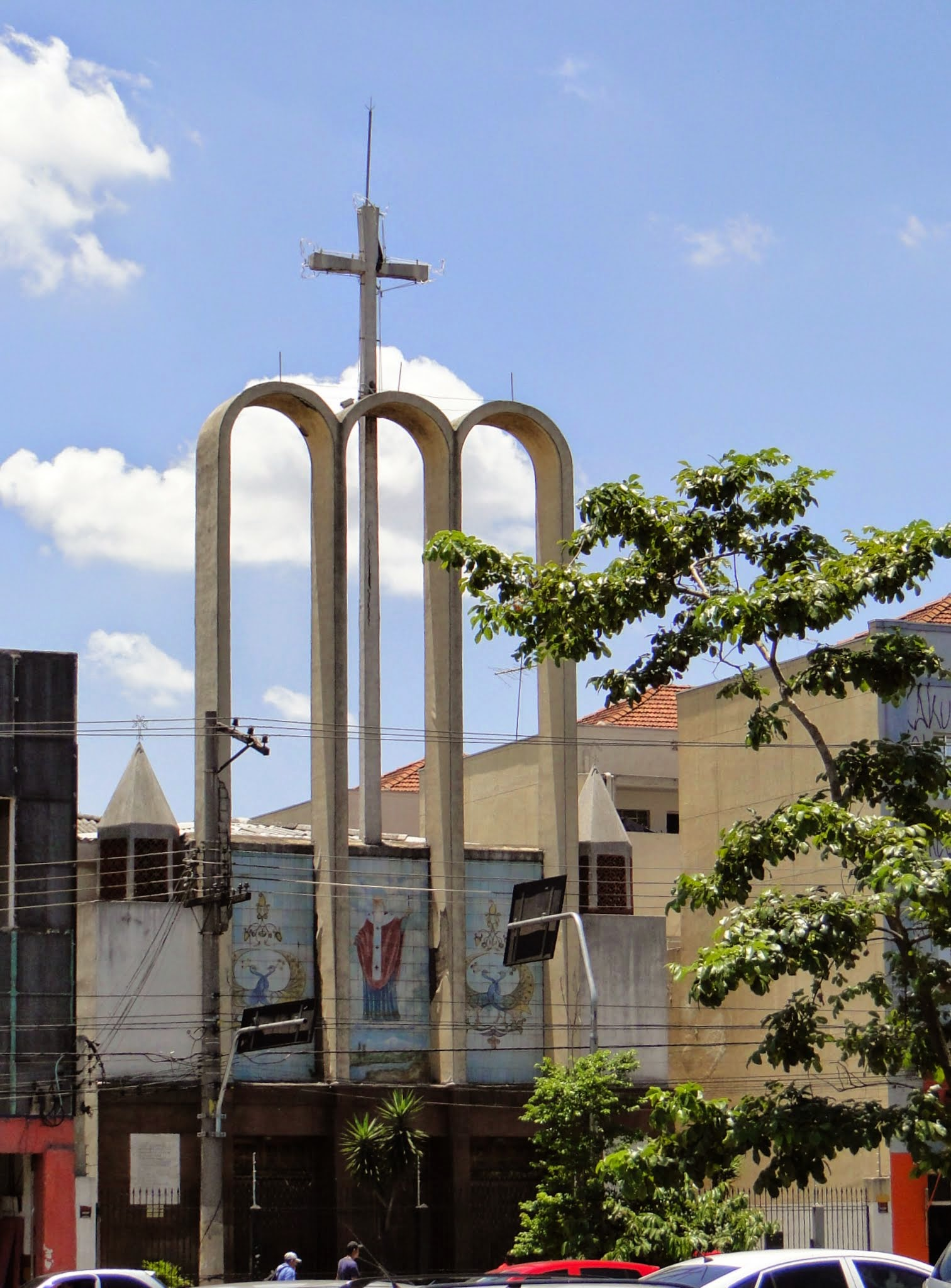
- St. Gregory the Illuminator Cathedral
- 23.52964°S 46.63143°W
- Location: São Paulo
- Country: Brazil
- Denomination: Catholic church (Armenian rite)

Administration
- Diocese: Armenian Catholic Apostolic Exarchate of Latin America and Mexico

The St. Gregory the Illuminator Cathedral (Portuguese: Catedral Armênia São Gregório Iluminador ) also called Armenian Cathedral of St. Gregory the Illuminator Is the name that receives a religious building affiliated to the Catholic Church that follows the Armenian rite and that is located in the Tiradentes Avenue, 718 Lux of the city of São Paulo in the state of the same name in the South part of the South American country of Brazil. It should not be confused with the other Catholic cathedrals of the city that include 4 of Latin rite (the Cathedral of Santo Amaro, Metropolitan Cathedral of Our Lady of the Assumption, Cathedral of St. Michael and Cathedral of the Holy Family) and the other 2 of Catholic oriental rites (Melkite Cathedral Our Lady of Paradise and the Maronite Cathedral of Our Lady of Lebanon).

The temple follows the Armenian Catholic rite and functions as the headquarters of the Armenian Catholic Apostolic Exarchate of Latin America and Mexico (Exarcado Apostólico para os fiéis de Rito Armênio residentes na América Latina e México) that is directly dependent on the congregation for the Eastern churches based in Rome.

It is under the pastoral responsibility of Bishop Pablo Hakimian.

== See also ==
- Roman Catholicism in Brazil
- Armenian Catholic Apostolic Exarchate of Latin America and Mexico
