= Our Lady of Narek Cathedral, Buenos Aires =

Our Lady of Narek Cathedral
- Catedral de Nuestra Señora de Narek
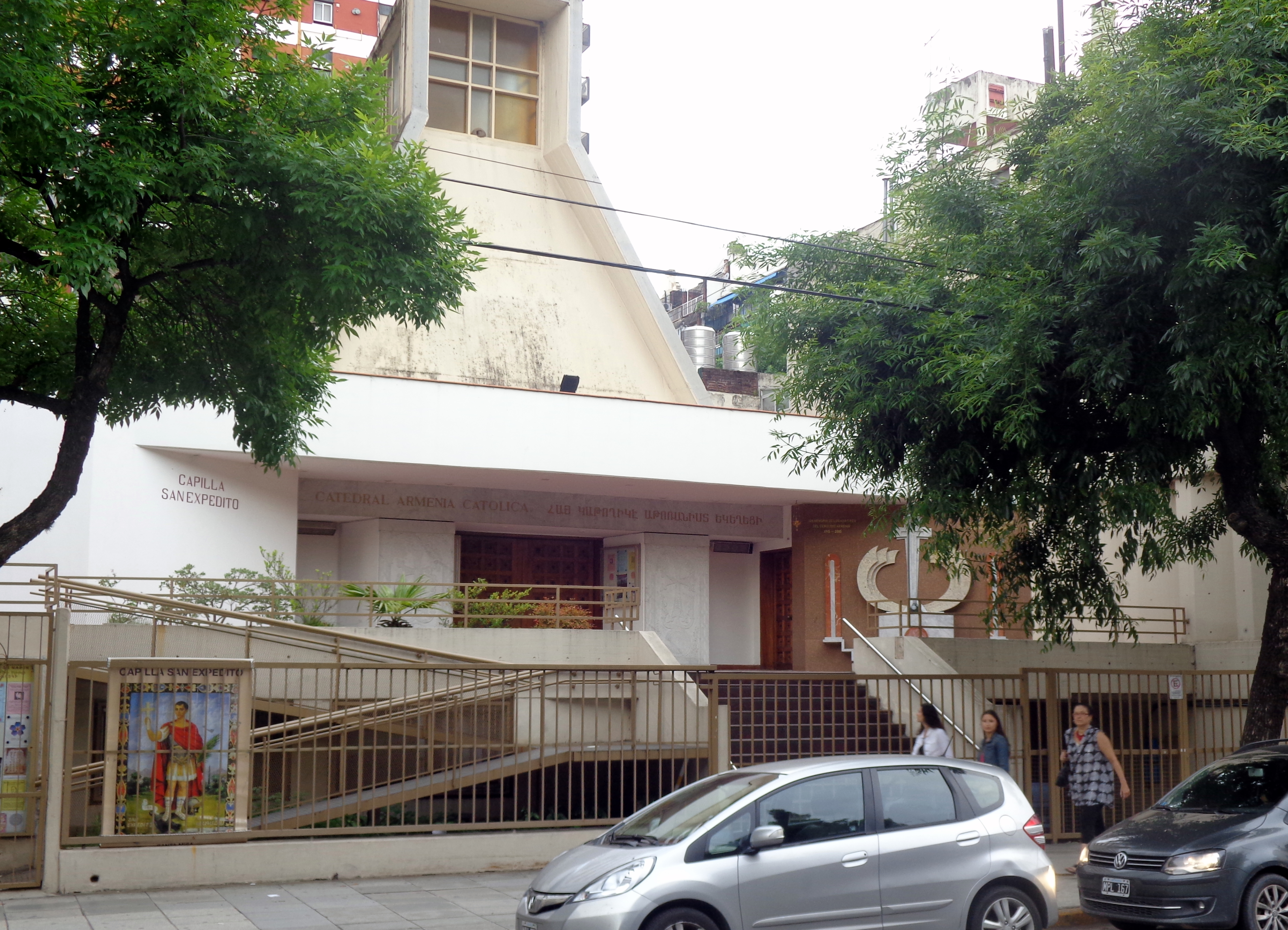
- Our Lady of Narek Cathedral
- 34.58960°S 58.41489°W
- Location: Buenos Aires
- Country: Argentina
- Denomination: Catholic Church (Armenian rite)

The Our Lady of Narek Cathedral (Spanish: Catedral de Nuestra Señora de Narek ) also called Armenian Cathedral of Our Lady of Narek (Catedral Armenia de Nuestra Señora de Narek) is an Armenian Catholic cathedral church that is located in the Charcas street in the city of Buenos Aires the capital of Argentina. The congregation follows the Armenian rite and is in full communion with the Pope. It is one of the five Catholic cathedrals in Buenos Aires, others following the Roman Rite (Metropolitan Cathedral of the Holy Trinity and the Military Cathedral), Maronite Rite (Cathedral of St. Maron), Ukrainian rite (Our Lady of Patrocinio Cathedral). It should not be confused with the Armenian Cathedral of St. Gregory the Enlightener (Armenian Apostolic Church).

The property on which the present structure was built was purchased in 1942 where a small chapel operated, the work of the new church was developed between 1971 and 1981 when it was officially consecrated. In 1983, the open space right in front of the church was established as Mount Ararat Square; in 1998, a monumental fountain representing Mount Ararat was inaugurated, with the attendance of the Armenian Catholic Bishop Vartán Waldir Boghossian. The temple is the main church of the Armenian Eparchy of San Gregory of Narek in Buenos Aires (Eparchia Sancti Gregorii Narekiani Bonaërensis Armenorum) created in 1989 by the bull "Cum Christifideles ritus Armeni in Republica Argentina" of the then Pope John Paul II to meet the religious needs of the local Armenian Catholic community.

The church is under the pastoral responsibility of Bishop Pablo Hakimian.

== See also ==
- Roman Catholicism in Argentina
- Armenian Catholic Eparchy of San Gregorio de Narek en Buenos Aires

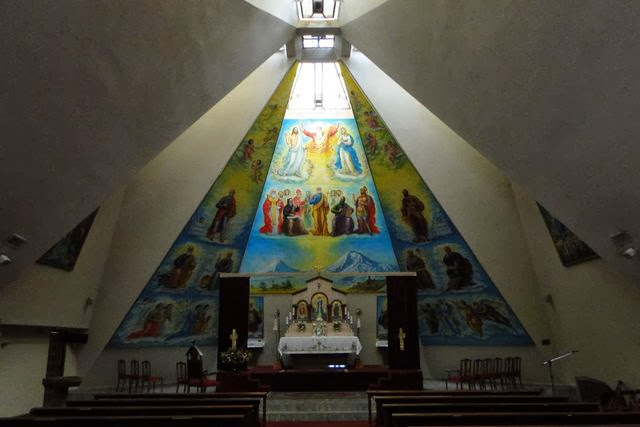
Internal view
