= Armenia–Uruguay relations =

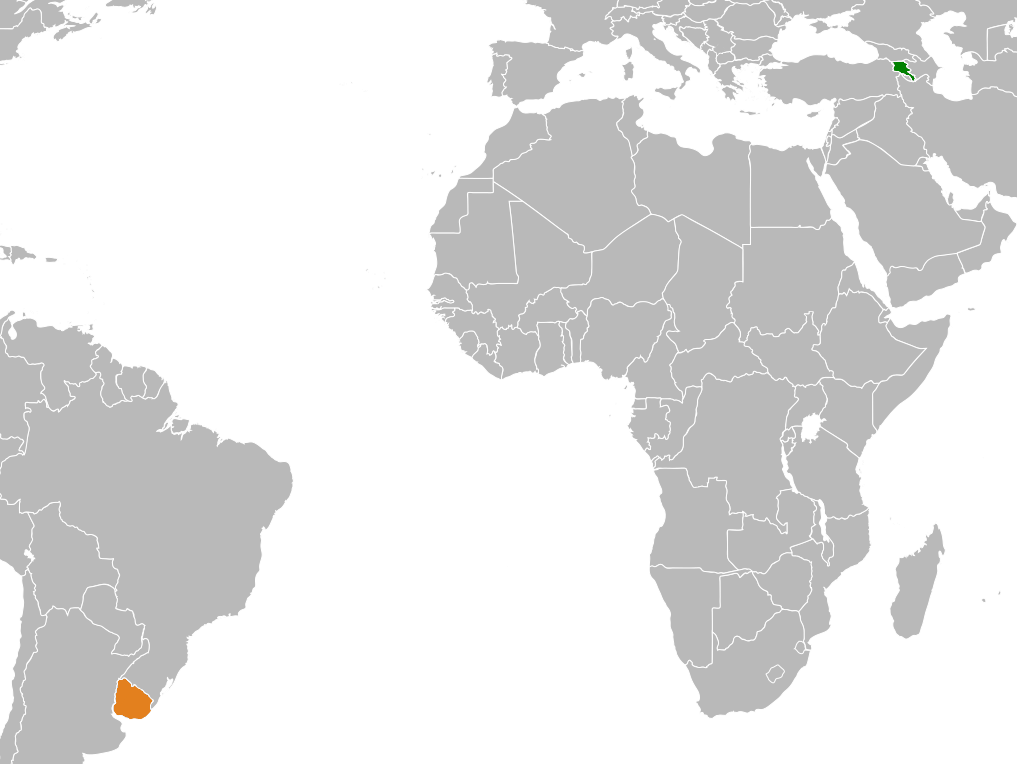

- Armenia: Uruguay

Foreign relations exist between Armenia and Uruguay. Uruguay, as a small South American nations hosts a large Armenian community for its size. The Armenian community in Uruguay totals approximately 16,000 people. Armenia has an embassy in Montevideo and Uruguay has an embassy in Yerevan. In 1965, Uruguay became the first country to recognize the Armenian genocide.

== History ==
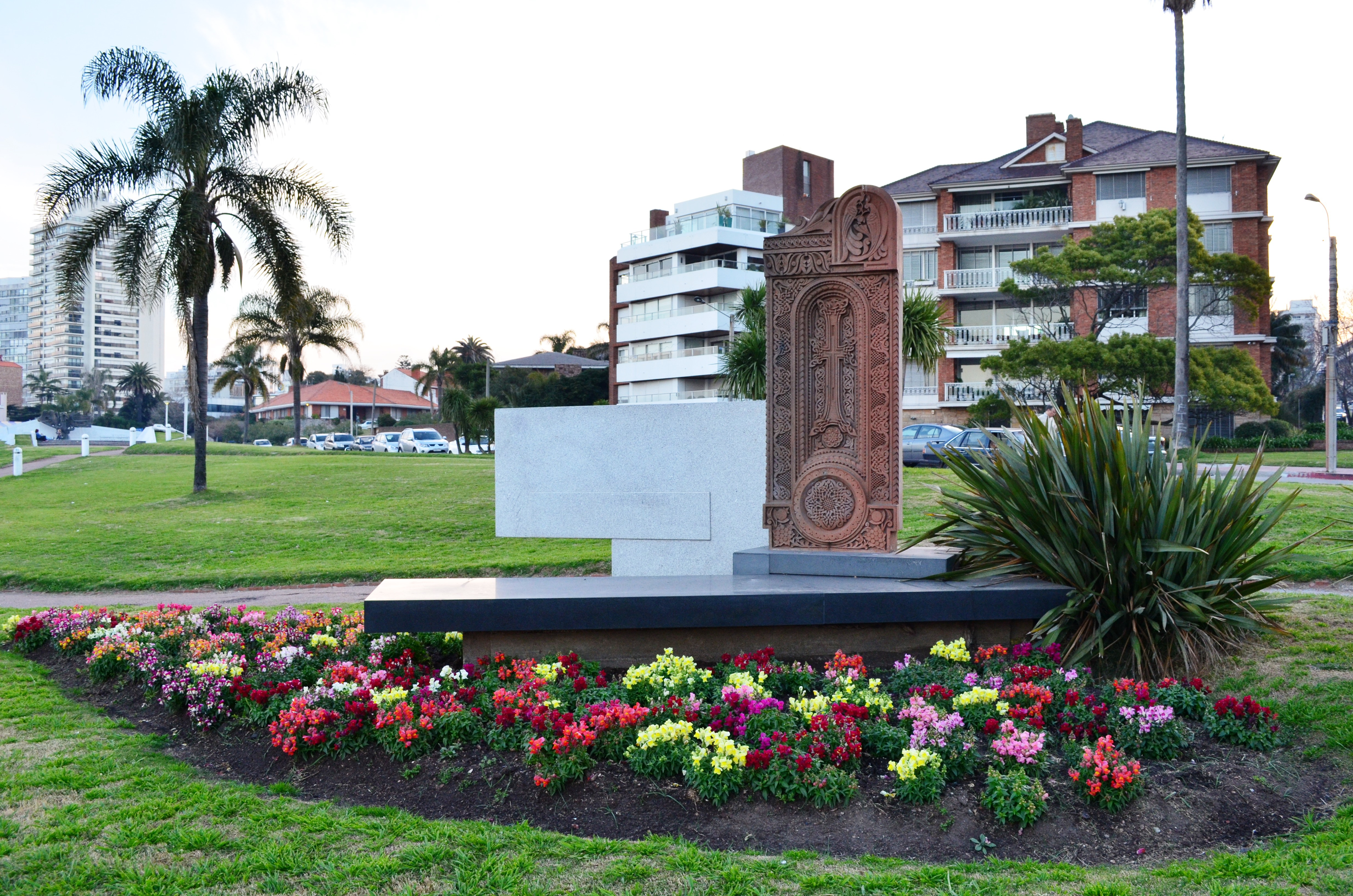
Armenian cross-stone (Khachkar) in Plaza Armenia in Montevideo

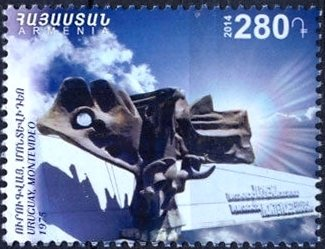
Stamp showing a monument dedicated by Armenians to Uruguay, work of Hugo Nantes

The first Armenians to arrive to Uruguay took place in the late 1800s. Between 1920 and 1930, large waves of Armenians arrived to the nation, many having survived the Armenian genocide carried out by the Ottoman Empire. On 20 April 1965, Uruguay became the first nation in the world to officially recognize the Armenian genocide. In 1939, the AGBU Uruguay Chapter opened its offices in Montevideo.

On 26 December 1991, Armenia regained independence after the Dissolution of the Soviet Union. On 27 May 1992, Armenia and Uruguay established diplomatic relations. In June 1992, Armenian President Levon Ter-Petrosyan paid an official visit to Uruguay. In February 1997, Uruguay opened an honorary consulate in Yerevan. In May 2012, Uruguayan Foreign Minister, Luis Almagro Lemes paid an official visit to Armenia, the highest Uruguayan official to visit the nation.

As of 2016, local Armenian organizations are denouncing efforts by Turkey to minimize Armenian presence.

In December 2021, Uruguay opened a resident embassy in Yerevan. In 2023, Armenia opened a resident embassy in Montevideo.

== High-level visits ==
High-level visits from Armenia to Uruguay

- President Levon Ter-Petrosyan (1992)
- Foreign Minister Vahan Papazian (1994)
- Foreign Minister Vartan Oskanian (2000)
- President Robert Kocharyan (2002)
- President Serzh Sargsyan (2014)
- President Vahagn Khachaturyan (2023)
- Foreign Minister Ararat Mirzoyan (2024)
- President Vahagn Khachaturyan (2025)

High-level visits from Uruguay to Armenia

- Deputy Foreign Minister Carlos Perez del Castillo (1997)
- Foreign Minister Luis Almagro (2012)
- Foreign Minister Rodolfo Nin Novoa (2019)
- Foreign Minister Francisco Bustillo (2021)

== Agreements ==
Armenia and Uruguay have signed numerous bilateral agreements since the establishment of diplomatic relations between both nations in 1992, such as an Agreement for the establishment of visa free regime with respect to diplomatic and service passports holders; Agreement on the cooperation in the field of culture; Agreement on the cooperation in the field of healthcare and medicine; Agreement on encouragement and mutual protection of investments; Agreement on eliminating the visa requirement for regular passport holders and an Agreement on economic cooperation.

== Diplomatic missions ==
- Armenia has an embassy in Montevideo.
- Uruguay has an embassy in Yerevan.

== See also ==
- Foreign relations of Armenia
- Foreign relations of Uruguay
- Armenian Uruguayans
- Armenian genocide recognition
