= Surp Nerses Shnorhali Cathedral, Montevideo =

Armenian Apostolic church in Bella Vista, Montevideo, Uruguay

Iglesia Apostólica Armenia San Nerses Shnorhali
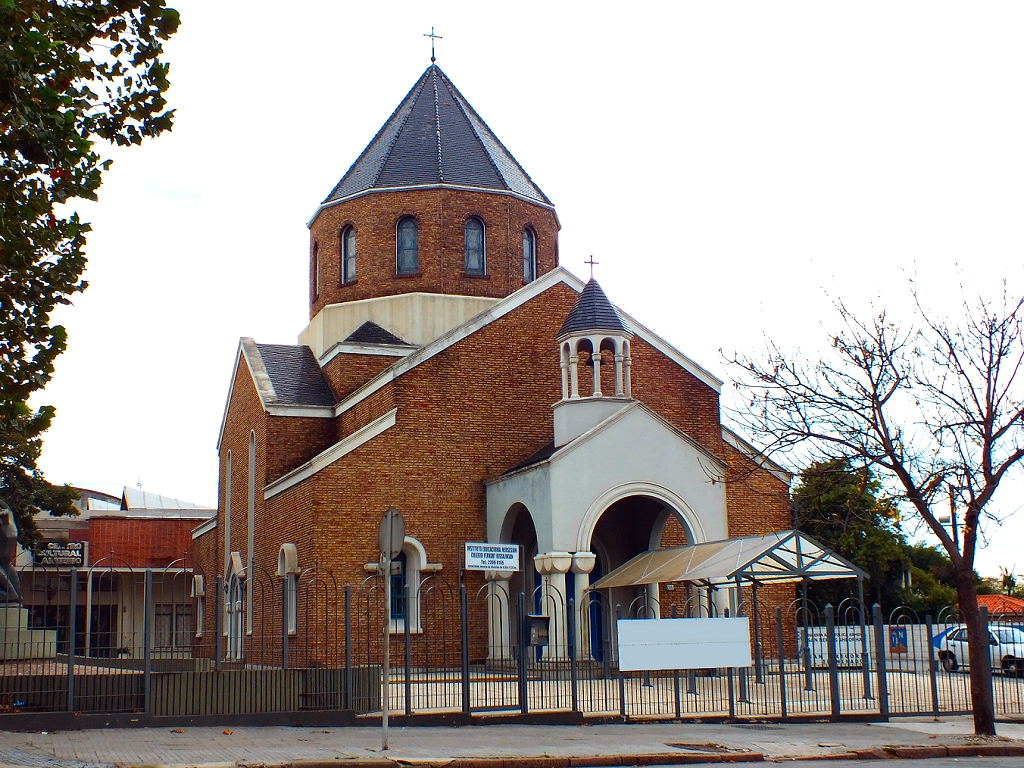

Religion
- Affiliation: Armenian Apostolic Church
- Ecclesiastical or organisational status: Cathedral

Location
- Location: Av. Agraciada; Montevideo, Uruguay
- Interactive map of Iglesia Apostólica Armenia San Nerses Shnorhali
- Coordinates: 34.878221°S 56.196037°W

Architecture
- Architect: Rafael Israelyan
- Style: Armenian

Surp Nerses Shnorhali Cathedral (Spanish: Iglesia Apostólica Armenia San Nerses Shnorhali; Armenian: Սուրբ Ներսէս Շնորհալի եկեղեցի) is an Armenian Apostolic church in the neighbourhood of Bella Vista, Montevideo, Uruguay.

This temple, dedicated to the Catholicos saint Nerses Shnorhali, is the prelacy of the Uruguayan Diocese of the Armenian Holy Apostolic Church. Its current head is Archbishop Hakob Glnjian.

The church is part of a bigger ensemble of buildings that house Armenian-Uruguayan institutions. There is a memorial to the Armenian genocide, with a sculpture by Nerses Ounanian.

== See also ==
- List of cathedrals in Uruguay
- Cathedral of Our Lady of Bzommar
- Armenians in Uruguay
