= Our Lady of Bzommar =

Marian shrine in Bzommar, Lebanon

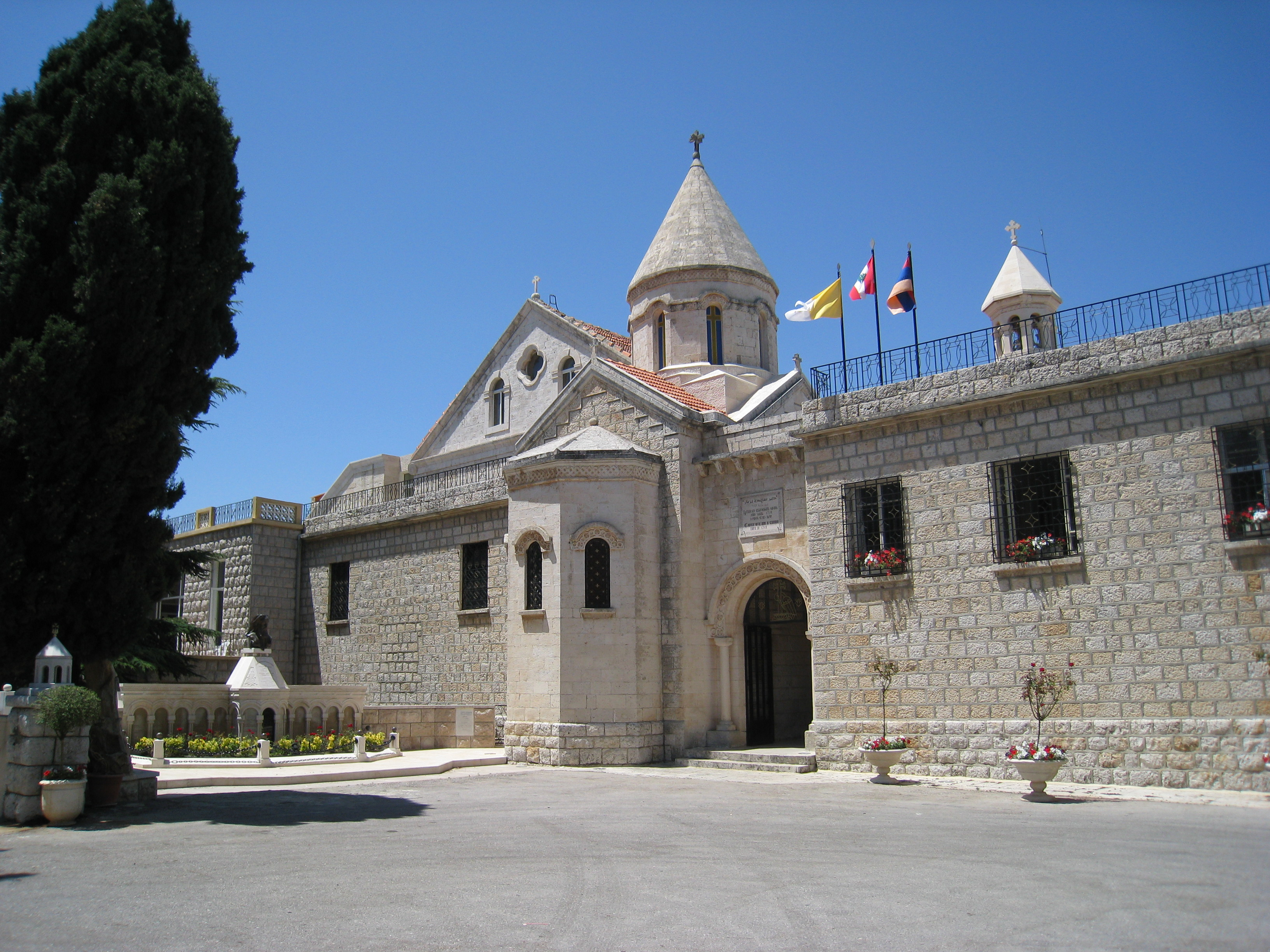
Headquarters of the Armenian Catholic Patriarchate in Bzoummar, Lebanon

Our Lady of Bzommar is a Marian shrine in Bzommar (Arabic: بزمار; Western Armenian: Զմմառ), Lebanon.

Bzommar is situated 36 km northeast of Beirut at an elevation ranging between 920m and 950m above the Mediterranean. It is part of the Caza of Keserwan. Bzoummar is home to a monastery of the Armenian Catholic Church that was built in 1749, where the image of Our Lady of Bzommar is venerated.

== History ==
The Bzommar Monastery, founded in 1749, includes the historic Church of the Assumption of the Virgin Mary, built in 1771. It is topped by a dome and features one of the first clocks installed on a church in Lebanon, dating back to 1903. The church also houses icons of the Twelve Apostles, which were brought from Rome.

The Bzommar Monastery contains a historical museum that preserves ancient artifacts belonging to patriarchs and bishops, in addition to relics of the True Cross and a thorn from the crown of thorns of Jesus Christ.

== Museum ==
The monastery museum contains historical ecclesiastical books and manuscripts that are being restored in a special workshop established specifically to preserve the history of the Armenian Church and the history of the Armenian people's conversion to Christianity.

== See also ==
- Cathedral of Our Lady of Bzommar
