= Pablo León Hakimian =

Egyptian Catholic bishop (1953–2024)

His Grace, The Most Reverend Pablo León Hakimian
- Eparch of San Gregorio de Narek en Buenos Aires
- Church: Armenian Catholic Church
- Diocese: Armenian Catholic Eparchy of San Gregorio de Narek en Buenos Aires
- Appointed: 4 July 2018
- Installed: 7 October 2018
- Predecessor: Vartan Waldir Boghossian, S.D.B.

Orders
- Ordination: 14 August 1981 by Hovhannes Bedros XVIII Kasparian, I.C.P.B.
- Consecration: 29 Semptember 2018 by Gregory Peter XX Ghabroyan, I.C.P.B.

Personal details
- Born: 11 November 1953 Cairo, Egypt
- Died: 6 November 2024 (aged 70) Buenos Aires, Argentina

Styles of Pablo León Hakimian
- Reference style: His Grace; The Most Reverend
- Spoken style: His Grace
- Religious style: Eparch

Pablo León Hakimian (11 November 1953 – 6 November 2024) was a bishop of the Catholic Church in Argentina. He served as the second eparch (bishop) of the Armenian Catholic Eparchy of San Gregorio de Narek en Buenos Aires from 2018 until his death in 2024.

== Biography ==
Pablo León Hakimian was born in Cairo, Egypt and ordained a priest on 14 August 1981 by Patriarch Jean Pierre XVIII Kasparian, I.C.P.B. Pope Francis named Hakimian as the eparch of San Gregorio de Narek en Buenos Aires on 4 July 2018. He was ordained a bishop by Patriarch Gregory Peter XX Ghabroyan, I.C.P.B. of the Armenian Catholic Church on 29 September 2018.

In September 2021, following the death of Patriarch Krikor Bedros XX Ghabroyan, he participated in the Elective Synod of the Armenian Catholic Church convened by Pope Francis at the Pontifical Armenian College in Rome. He was part of the body of bishops that elected Raphaël Bedros XXI Minassian as the new Patriarch of Cilicia.

Hakimian died in Buenos Aires on 6 November 2024, at the age of 70.

== See also ==
- Catholic Church hierarchy
- Catholic Church in Argentina
- Historical list of the Catholic bishops of Argentina
- List of Catholic bishops of Argentina
- Lists of patriarchs, archbishops, and bishops

== Episcopal succession ==
Catholic Church titles
Preceded by Vartán Waldir Boghossian, S.D.B.	Armenian Catholic Eparch of San Gregorio de Narek en Buenos Aires; 2018–2024	Succeeded by Vacant
