= Nuestra Señora del Rosario, Montevideo =

Roman Catholic church building in Bella Vista, Montevideo, Uruguay

Coordinates: 34°52′21.1″S 56°12′6″W

Iglesia Nuestra Señora del Rosario (Maturana)
- Iglesia Nuestra Señora del Rosario en 2026.

Religion
- Affiliation: Roman Catholic
- Ecclesiastical or organisational status: Chapel
- Year consecrated: 1943

Location
- Location: Avenida Agraciada 3024; Montevideo, Uruguay

Architecture
- Type: Church

The Church of Our Lady of the Rosary (Spanish: Iglesia Nuestra Señora del Rosario), popularly known as Capilla Maturana, is a Roman Catholic church building in the neighbourhood of Bella Vista, Montevideo, Uruguay.

The first church was consecrated in 1923, although the current temple was built two decades later. It is dedicated to Our Lady of the Rosary and held by the Salesians of Don Bosco, who also run the adjacent private school "San Francisco de Sales". Both the church and the school are known as "Maturana", since this is the name of a nearby street where they were originally located in 1907.

== Same devotion ==
There are other churches in Uruguay dedicated to Our Lady of the Rosary:

- Parish Church of Our Lady of the Rosary and St. Dominic in Cordón
- Parish Church of Our Lady of the Rosary in La Barra
- Our Lady of the Rosary Parish Church in Rosario
- Basilica of Our Lady of the Rosary and St. Benedict of Palermo in Paysandú
- Our Lady of the Rosary Parish Church in Villa Rodríguez

And some temples dedicated to the Virgin of the Rosary of Pompei:

- Parish Church of Our Lady of the Rosary of Pompei in Piedras Blancas
- Our Lady of the Rosary of Pompei Parish Church in San José de Mayo
