= Acts of Narsai =

The Acts of Narsai is a hagiographical text and work of Christian Syriac literature composed in the middle of the 5th century which pertains to the priest Narsai.

== Narrative ==
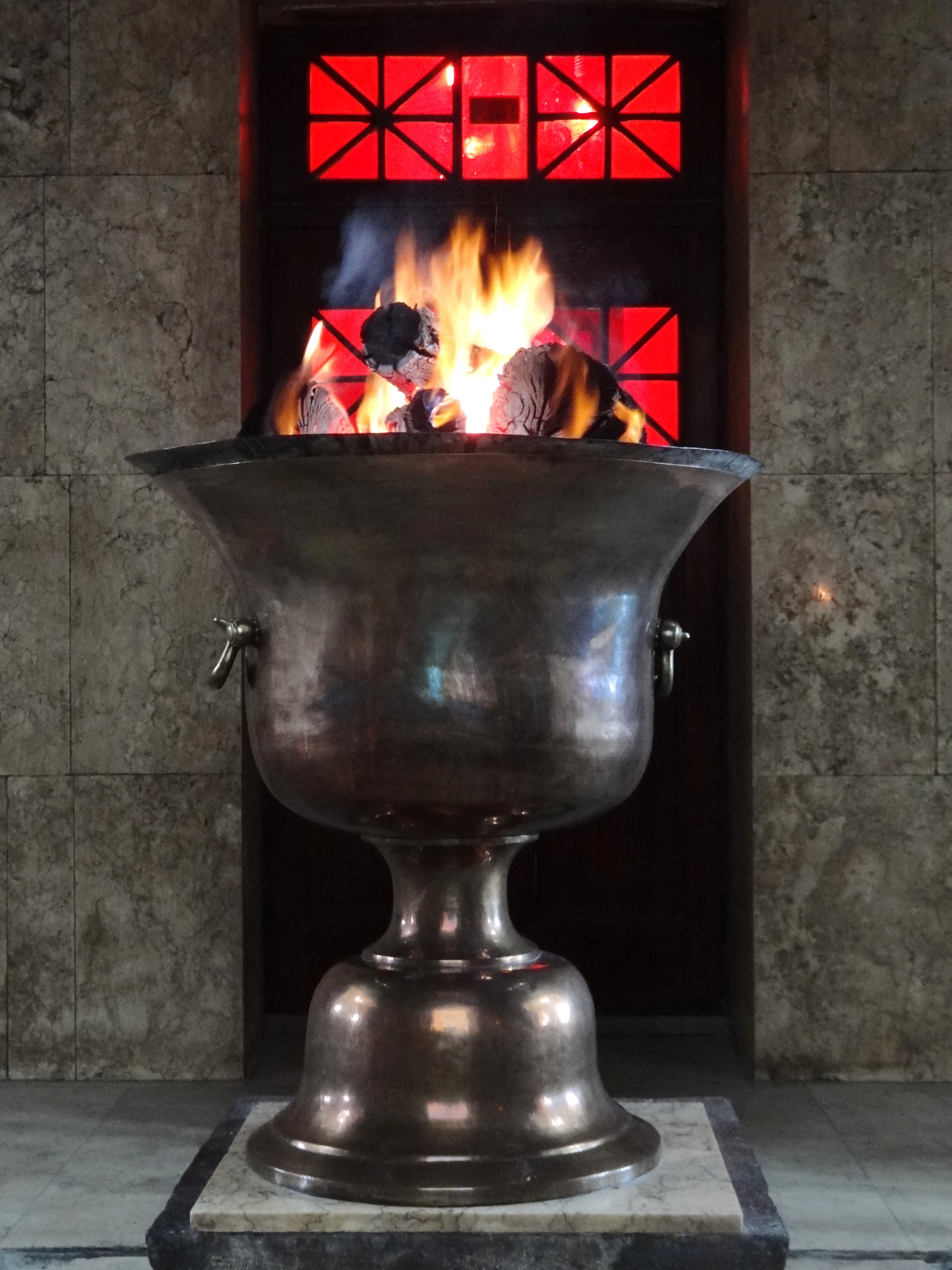
A burning fire in the Zoroastrian temple of Yazd, Iran.

The text begins with the priest Narsai and his companion Shapur acquiring land and a land title in Rayy from the Zoroastrian convert Adarparwa to build a church. Adarparwa though is persuaded by the local mobad Adurboze to renounce the church Narsai had constructed, and instead, convert it into a Fire Temple. Adarparwa complies and converts the church into a temple while Narsai is absent, but upon his return, Narsai tosses the sacred items out and extinguishes the fire. This causes a crowd to form and Narsai is brought to Adurboze in Ctesiphon for interrogation; Adurboze requested Narsai to restore the temple but refuses. (Acts of Narsai, 173) Narsai was then ransomed but is later returned for interrogation by a marzban who was given orders from Yazdegerd I to release Narsai if Narsai denies his involvement with putting out the fire or is willing to replace it. Narsai acknowledges his involvement and refuses to apologize; Narsai is condemned to death. (Acts of Narsai, 175-6)

Narsai is then escorted to the place of execution, but while being escorted, he passes by a monastery. There, monks offer him water but he refused, but Narsai requested that they pray for him instead. In his execution, a lictor who is a Christian apostate was supposed to execute Narsai but was struck down by God. Narsai though is eventually beheaded by a magian. (Acts of Narsai, 178-9) Narsai's head, blood, and body are then taken by Christians to be buried at a site built by Mar Marutha, bishop of Suf. The remains of Narsai are later taken by the author of the text and others to the place where Lawarne was martyred for the benefit and healing of the people, but also in concern that the magians would despoil the body during a new persecution. The text is concluded with a request from Christ, 'lord of the martyrs' to grant us an inheritance in the kingdom of heaven alongside the martyrs 'who were crowned with his love'. (Acts of Narsai, 180)

== Authorship ==
The Acts of Narsai is one of four hagiographical works composed in a monastery near Ctesiphon, the others are Tataq, the ten martyrs of Beth Garmai, and Jacob the notary which all have been dated to the middle of the 5th century and all recount similar events to that of the Acts of Abda. All texts have been contributed to the monk Abgar, the only hagiographer whose name and context was known in the fifth and sixth centuries. Abgar was living in Ctesiphon where the executions of the martyrs were taking place in the field Sliq harubta just outside the city. Sliq harubta is also where the monks of Abgar's monastery gathered the relics of the martyrs.

== Bibliography ==
- Sarris, Peter; Dal Santo, Matthew; Booth, Phil (2011). An Age of Saints?: Power, Conflict and Dissent in Early Medieval Christianity. BRILL. ISBN 9789004206595.
- Wood, Philip (2013). The Chronicle of Seert: Christian Historical Imagination in Late Antique Iraq. Oxford University Press. ISBN 9780199670673.
