= Bella Vista, Montevideo =

Capurro - Bella Vista
- Barrio
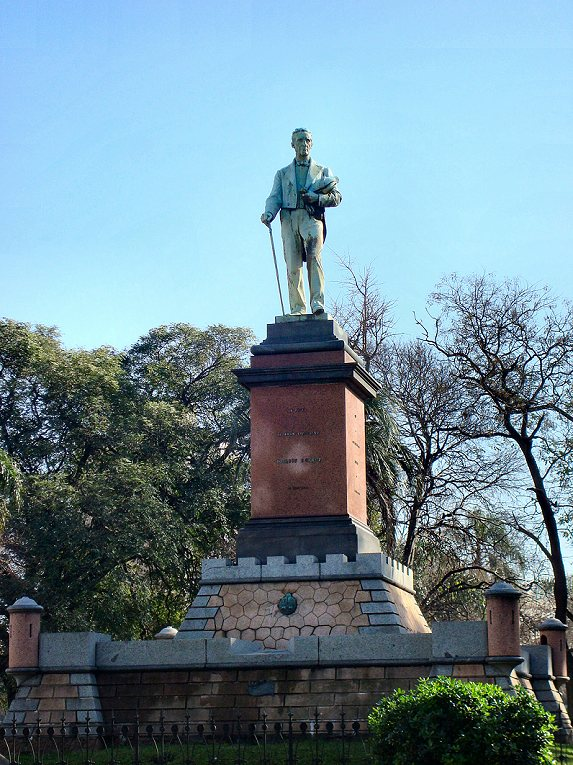
- Monument to Joaquín Suárez

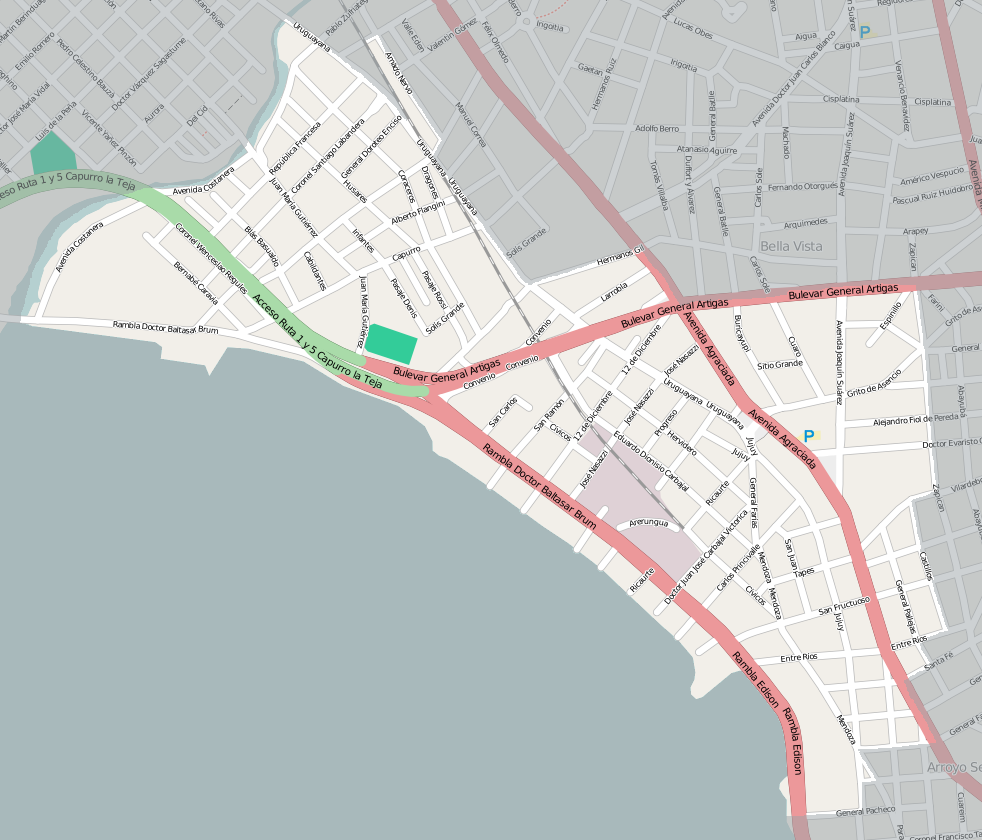
- Street map of Capurro - Bella Vista

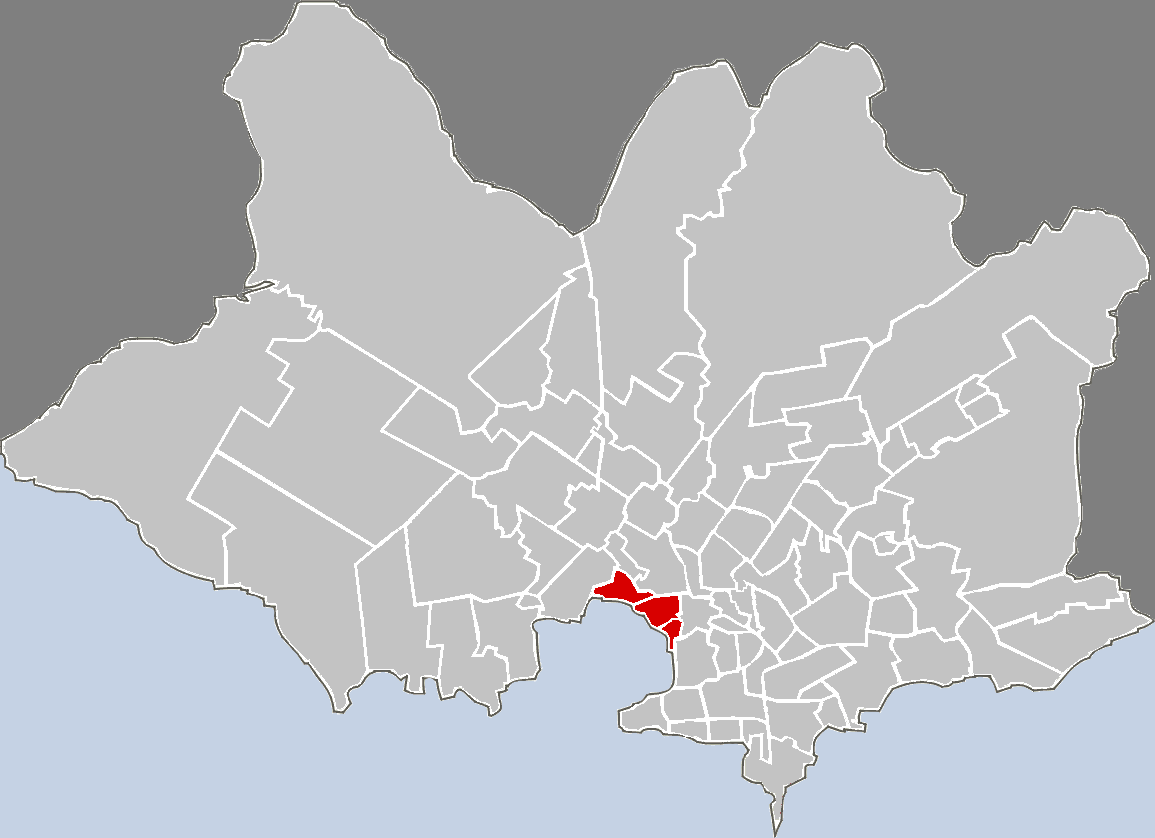
- Location of Capurro - Bella Vista in Montevideo
- Coordinates: 34°52′31″S 56°11′12″W
- Country: Uruguay
- Department: Montevideo Department
- City: Montevideo

Bella Vista is a barrio (neighbourhood or district) of Montevideo, Uruguay and part of the Capurro / Bella Vista composite barrio, with Artigas Boulevard separating the two.

== Location ==
Bella Vista shares borders with Capurro to the north west, Prado to the north, Reducto to the east, Aguada and the Port of Montevideo (which belongs to the Ciudad Vieja) to the south, and it borders the Bay of Montevideo to the south west.

The south part of Bella Vista has also been known as Arroyo Seco (dry stream) from as early as 1756. The name is still used today, though there are no precise limits that describe this area.

== History ==
Though there had been a few villas in this area before the 1840s, among which the residence of Joaquín Suárez, it was Francisco Farías who started auctioning building lots of the area in 1842. At the time, Bella Vista was famous for offering a most scenic view of the bay and the city, hence its name. In 1869 the first train station was inaugurated in the area, but in 1873 the Estación Central General Artigas in Aguada took its place.

== Main streets and squares ==
The main streets of Bella Vista are Agraciada Avenue, Joaquín Suárez Avenue and Rambla Balthasar Brum, which runs along the coastline. Its two main squares are Plaza San Martín, dedicated to the Argentine independence hero, and Plaza Joaquín Suárez, dedicated to the politician and twice President of the Republic, whose statue, on the south edge of the square, marks the beginning of the homonymous avenue.

== Buildings and locations ==
On Tapes street is located the Sanctuary of Our Lady of Perpetual Help and St. Alphonsus (Parroquia Nuestra Señora del Perpetuo Soccorro y San Alfonso), notable among other for its architecture and on Agraciada Avenue the Armenian Apostólic church. Along the Rambla most notably are the central installations of the electric power company of Montevideo, the "UTE - Central José Batlle y Ordóñez", and behind it is the Palacio de la Luz, housing the administrative offices of the UTE. Three blocks southwest of Plaza San Martin is the Museo Geominero del Uruguay, which belongs to the National Direction of Mining and Geology.

The west part of this barrio, which runs parallel to the Rambla, is an industrial area, with many old industrial buildings which serve now as warehouses. Among other functioning industries is the beer factory Fábricas Nacionales de Cerveza.

== Places of worship ==
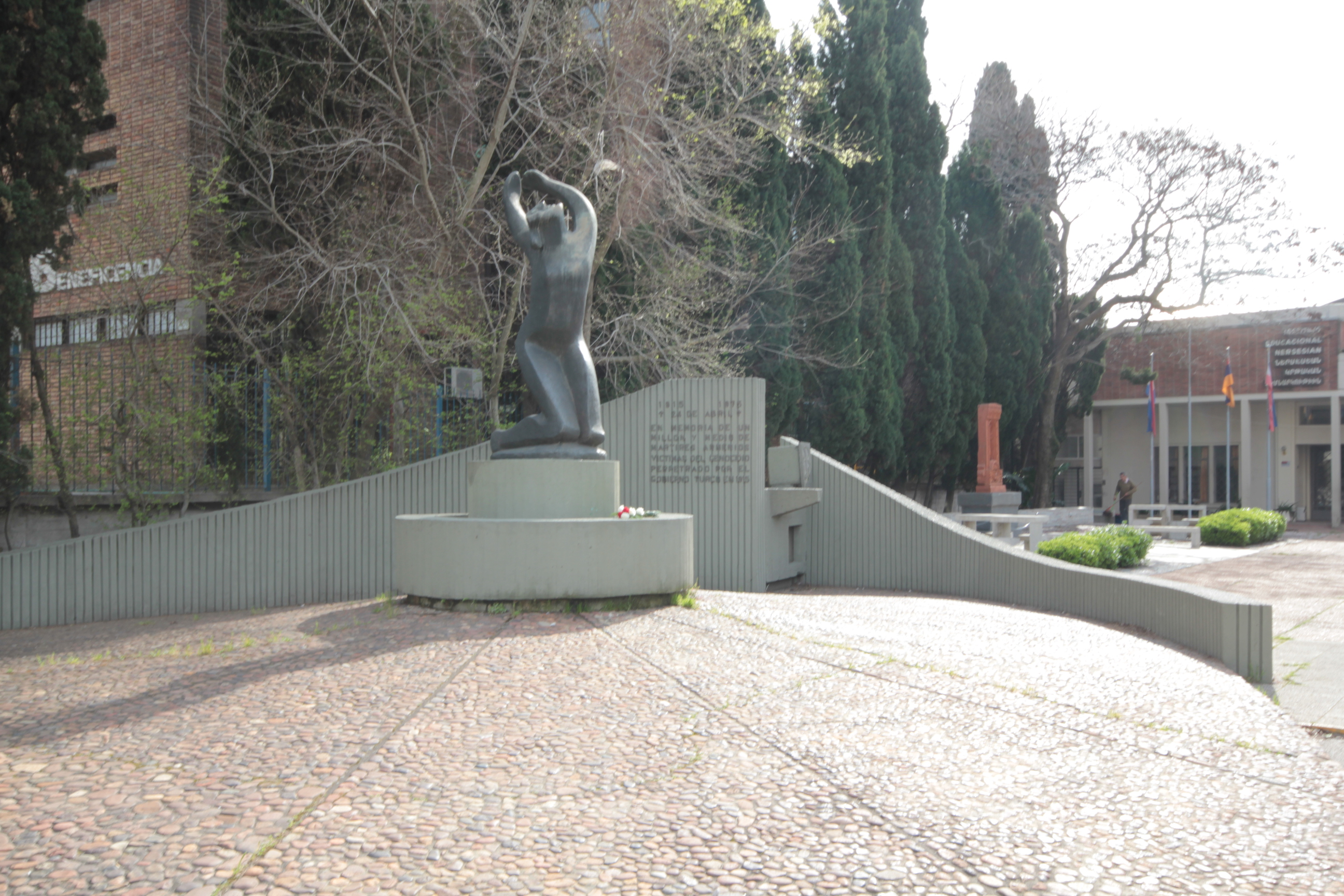
Memorial to the Armenian Genocide, Montevideo, with sculpture by Nerses Ounanian.

- Church of Our Lady of Perpetual Help and St Alphonsus, popularly known as "Iglesia de Tapes" (Roman Catholic)
- Chapel of Our Lady of the Rosary, popularly known as "Capilla Maturana" (Roman Catholic, Salesians of Don Bosco)
- St. Nerses Shnorhali Church (Armenian Apostolic)

== See also ==
- Barrios of Montevideo
