= Nerses Ounanian =

Uruguayan artist of Armenian descent

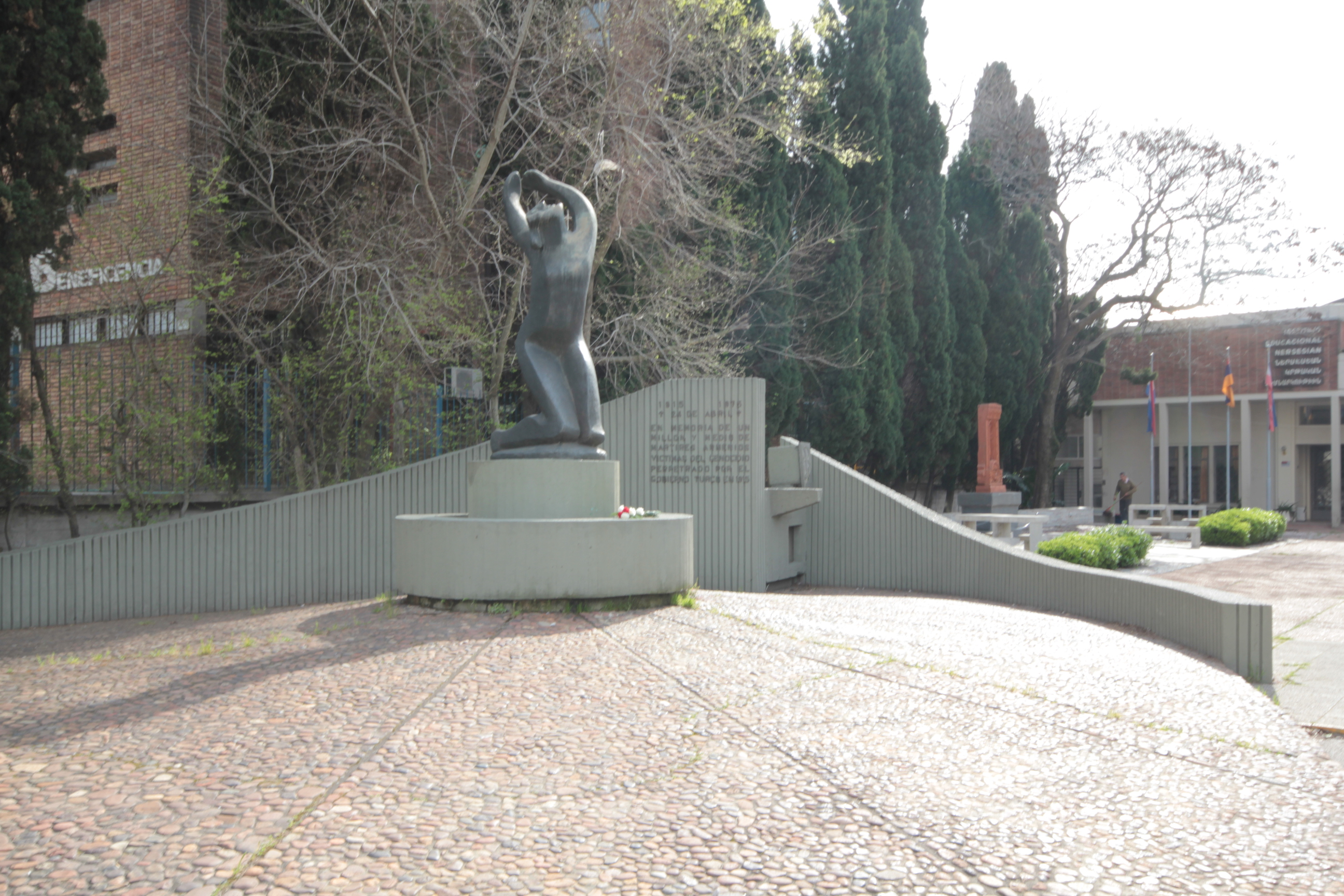
Memorial to the Armenian Genocide, Montevideo, with sculpture by Nerses Ounanian.

Nerses Ounanian (Armenian: Ներսէս Ունանեան) (1 August 1924 in Samos – 18 December 1957 in Montevideo) was an Uruguayan artist of Armenian descent.

He was a pupil of Antonio Pena and Edmundo Prati. His most representative work is a memorial to the Armenian Genocide in the Bella Vista neighbourhood of Montevideo, where also a street bears his name.
