= Joseph Arnaouti =

Syrian Armenian Catholic bishop (1936–2026)

The Most Reverend Joseph Arnaouti ICPB
- Patriarchal Exarch Emeritus of Damascus
- Native name: Յովսէփ Արնաութեան
- Church: Armenian Catholic Church
- Archdiocese: Damascus
- Province: Cilicia
- Installed: 24 May 1997
- Term ended: December 2023
- Predecessor: Kevork Tayroyan
- Successor: Kevork Assadourian
- Other posts: Bishop of Qamishli (1989–1992), Auxiliary Bishop of San Gregorio de Narek en Buenos Aires (1994–1997), Curial Bishop of Cilicia (1997–1999)

Orders
- Ordination: 5 April 1969 by Georges Layek
- Consecration: 18 March 1990 by Hovhannes Bedros XVIII Kasparian, André Bedoglouyan, Krikor Ayvazian

Personal details
- Born: 2 May 1936 Aleppo, First Syrian Republic
- Died: 7 September 2026 (aged 90) Bzoummar, Lebanon
- Education: Pontifical Gregorian University, Saint Joseph University of Beirut

Joseph Arnaouti, ICPB (Armenian: Յովսէփ Արնաութեան; 2 May 1936 – 7 September 2026) was a Syrian Armenian Catholic hierarch. He served as the Patriarchal Exarch of Damascus from 1997 to 2023.

== Life and career ==
=== Early life and education ===
Joseph Arnaouti was born in Aleppo, Syria, on 2 May 1936. He received his early education at the St. Gregory the Illuminator School in Aleppo. On 19 July 1947, he entered the novitiate of the Patriarchal Congregation of Bzommar, beginning his religious formation. In 1954, he completed his secondary education at the Bzommar novitiate and at the Marist Brothers school in Jounieh.

In 1955, Arnaouti went to Rome where he pursued his studies at the Pontifical Armenian College (Levonian College). From 1955 to 1959, he studied philosophy and theology at the Pontifical Gregorian University under the direction of the Jesuits. After an interruption of his studies for health reasons, he resumed his theological education in Lebanon, attending courses at Saint Joseph University of Beirut from 1966 to 1969.

=== Priesthood ===
Following the completion of his spiritual formation, Arnaouti was ordained as a subdeacon on 2 February 1969 and as a deacon on 25 March 1969. On 5 April 1969, he was ordained as a priest for the Patriarchal Congregation of Bzommar at the cathedral church in Aleppo by Archbishop Georges Layek. From 1969 to 1982, he served as superior of the novitiate in Aleppo and later as pastor of the city's cathedral. From 1982 to 1984, he served as pastor of Holy Cross Church in Paris. From 1984 to 1990, he served as patriarchal vicar of the Patriarchal Congregation of Bzommar and superior of Bzommar Monastery. During his tenure, the statutes of the Patriarchal Congregation of Bzommar were officially published in 1986.

=== Episcopate ===
On 21 August 1989, he was appointed bishop of the Armenian Catholic Eparchy of Qamishli. He was consecrated as a bishop on 18 March 1990 by Patriarch Hovhannes Bedros XVIII Kasparian, with bishops André Bedoglouyan and Krikor Ayvazian as co-consecrators. He resigned on 10 April 1992 and later he served as an auxiliary bishop for the Armenian Catholic Eparchy of San Gregorio de Narek en Buenos Aires in Argentina from 24 May 1994 until 1997 and as a curial bishop of the Armenian Catholic Patriarchate of Cilicia from 1997 to 1999.

Simultaneously, on 24 May 1997 he was appointed the Patriarchal Exarch of Damascus for the Armenian Catholics. He served in this position until December 2023.

=== Ministry and views ===
Arnaouti was an active participant in regional synods and ecumenical efforts. During the Special Assembly for the Middle East of the Synod of Bishops in 2010, he emphasized the importance of the Christian presence in the region and addressed the specific pastoral needs of the Armenian diaspora.

During the Syrian civil war he remained in the capital, often joining other Christian leaders in Damascus to advocate for peace. In 2015, he joined the Patriarchs of Antioch in a joint statement calling for an end to arms trafficking to stop the conflict in Syria. He also maintained close ties with other Eastern Christian prelates, including the Syriac Orthodox Church, participating in inter-church hospitality and diplomatic meetings in Damascus.

In September 2021, following the death of Patriarch Krikor Bedros XX Ghabroyan, Arnaouti participated in the elective synod of the Armenian Catholic Church convened by Pope Francis at the Pontifical Armenian College in Rome. He was part of the body of bishops that elected Raphaël Bedros XXI Minassian as the new Patriarch of Cilicia.

=== Later life and death ===
Arnaouti went to Lebanon in 2024 and settled at the Patriarchal Monastery in Bzoummar in 2025, where he spent the final period of his life. He died on 7 September 2026, at the age of 90, and was buried in Bzoummar.

Catholic Church titles
Preceded by Kevork Tayroyan	Patriarchal Exarch of Damascus; 1997–2023	Succeeded by Kevork Assadourian
Preceded by –	Curial Bishop of Cilicia; 1997–1999	Succeeded by –
Preceded by –	Auxiliary Bishop of San Gregorio de Narek en Buenos Aires; 1994–1997	Succeeded by –
Preceded by Krikor Ayvazian	Bishop of Qamishli; 1989–1992	Succeeded by Antranig Ayvazian
