= Antranig Ayvazian =

Syrian Armenian Catholic bishop (born 1947)

Most Reverend Antranig Ayvazian
- Bishop of Qamishli
- Native name: Անդրանիկ Այվազեան
- Church: Armenian Catholic Church
- Province: Cilicia
- Installed: 20 August 2022
- Predecessor: Joseph Arnaouti (as Bishop); Boutros Marayati (as Administrator)

Orders
- Ordination: 18 March 1972
- Consecration: 5 October 2022 by Raphaël Bedros XXI Minassian, Boutros Marayati, Kévork Assadourian

Personal details
- Born: Antranig Ayvazian; 29 August 1947 (age 79) Al-Hasakah, First Syrian Republic
- Education: Saint Joseph University of Beirut, Pontifical Gregorian University

Antranig Ayvazian (Armenian: Անդրանիկ Այվազեան; born 29 August 1947) is a Syrian Armenian Catholic hierarch. Since 2022, he has served as the Bishop of the Armenian Catholic Eparchy of Qamishli in northeastern Syria.

== Biography ==
Antranig Ayvazian was born in Al-Hasakah, Syria, on 29 August 1947. He entered the Patriarchal Seminary in Bzommar, after studied at the Saint Joseph University of Beirut in Lebanon, and later pursued his ecclesiastical studies at the Pontifical Gregorian University, where he earned degrees in philosophy and theology. He was ordained to the priesthood on 18 March 1972 for the Eparchy of Qamishli.

During his ministry, Ayvazian served as a parish priest in Al-Hasakah and later in Yerevan, Armenia. He was deeply involved in religious media, serving as the director of Radio Maria Armenia for several years, where he worked to promote spiritual and cultural programming for the Armenian diaspora.

On 20 August 2022, the Synod of Bishops of the Armenian Catholic Church elected him as the Bishop of Qamishli, filling a vacancy that had been managed by Apostolic Administrators since 1992. His election was confirmed by Pope Francis on the same day. He was consecrated as a bishop on 5 October 2022 at the Our Lady of Bzommar Shrine by Patriarch Raphaël Bedros XXI Minassian, with Archbishop Boutros Marayati and Bishop Kévork Assadourian as co-consecrators.

As Bishop of Kamichlié, Ayvazian's jurisdiction covers the Al-Hasakah Governorate in northeastern Syria, a region significantly affected by the Syrian civil war. He has focused on the reconstruction of churches and the spiritual accompaniment of the remaining Armenian families in the Deir ez-Zor Governorate.
