= Armenian Catholic Eparchy of Qamishli =

Eastern Catholic eparchy in Syria

The Armenian Catholic Eparchy of Qamishli is a suffragan eparchy (Eastern Catholic diocese) of the Armenian Catholic Church sui iuris (Armenian Rite in Armenian language) in the Patriarch's own ecclesiastical province 'of Cilicia', serving part of Syria.

Its cathedral eparchial (episcopal) see is the Cathedral of Saint-Joseph, in Qamishli.

== History ==
Established on 29 June 1954 as Eparchy (Diocese) of Al-Qamishli, on territory split off from the then Armenian Catholic Archeparchy of Mardin (now titular).

== Episcopal ordinaries ==
(all Armenian Rite)

Suffragan Eparchs (Bishops) of Al-Qamishli

- Joseph Gennangi (1954.10.21 – 1972.11.20); emeritate as Titular Bishop of Adana of the Armenians (1972.11.20 – death 1981.10.22)
- Krikor Ayvazian (1972.12.06 – 1988.11.18), emeritate as Titular Bishop of Marasc of the Armenians (1988.11.23 – 1997.01.21)
- Apostolic Administrator André Bedoglouyan, Patriarchal Clergy Institute of Bzommar (I.C.P.B.) (1988 – 1989), while Titular Bishop of Comana Armeniæ (1971.07.24 – 2010.04.13) & Auxiliary Eparch of Cilicia of the Armenians (Lebanon) (1971.07.24 – 1994.11.05); later Patriarchal Exarch of Jerusalem of the Armenians (Jordan) (1995 – 1998), Protosyncellus of Amman and Jerusalem of the Armenians (Jordan) (1998 – 2001)
- Joseph Arnaouti, I.C.P.B. (1989.08.21 – 1992.04.10), later Auxiliary Eparch of San Gregorio de Narek en Buenos Aires of the Armenians (Argentina) (1994.05.24 – 1997), Bishop of Curia of the Armenians (1997 – 1999), Patriarchal Exarch of Damascus of the Armenians (Syria) (1997 – ...)
- Apostolic Administrator Boutros Marayati (1992.04.10 – 2022.08.20), while Archeparch (Archbishop) of Aleppo of the Armenians (Syria) (1989.08.21 – ...)
- Antranig Ayvazian (2022.08.20 – ...)

== See also ==
- Catholic Church in Syria
