= Nazzaro =

Nazzaro is a surname. Notable people with the name include:

- Felice Nazzaro (1881–1940), Italian racing driver
- Gianni Nazzaro (1948–2021), Italian singer and actor
- Giuseppe Nazzaro (1937–2015), Italian Roman Catholic bishop
- Joseph J. Nazzaro (1913–1990), United States Air Force general

== See also ==
- Automobili Nazzaro (1911-1924), Vehicle manufacturer founded in Turin by Felice Nazzaro
- Nazarro
- San Nazzaro (disambiguation)
