= Church of Saint Francis of Assisi, Aleppo =

Coordinates: 36.2099°N 37.1550°E

Saint Francis of Assisi Church
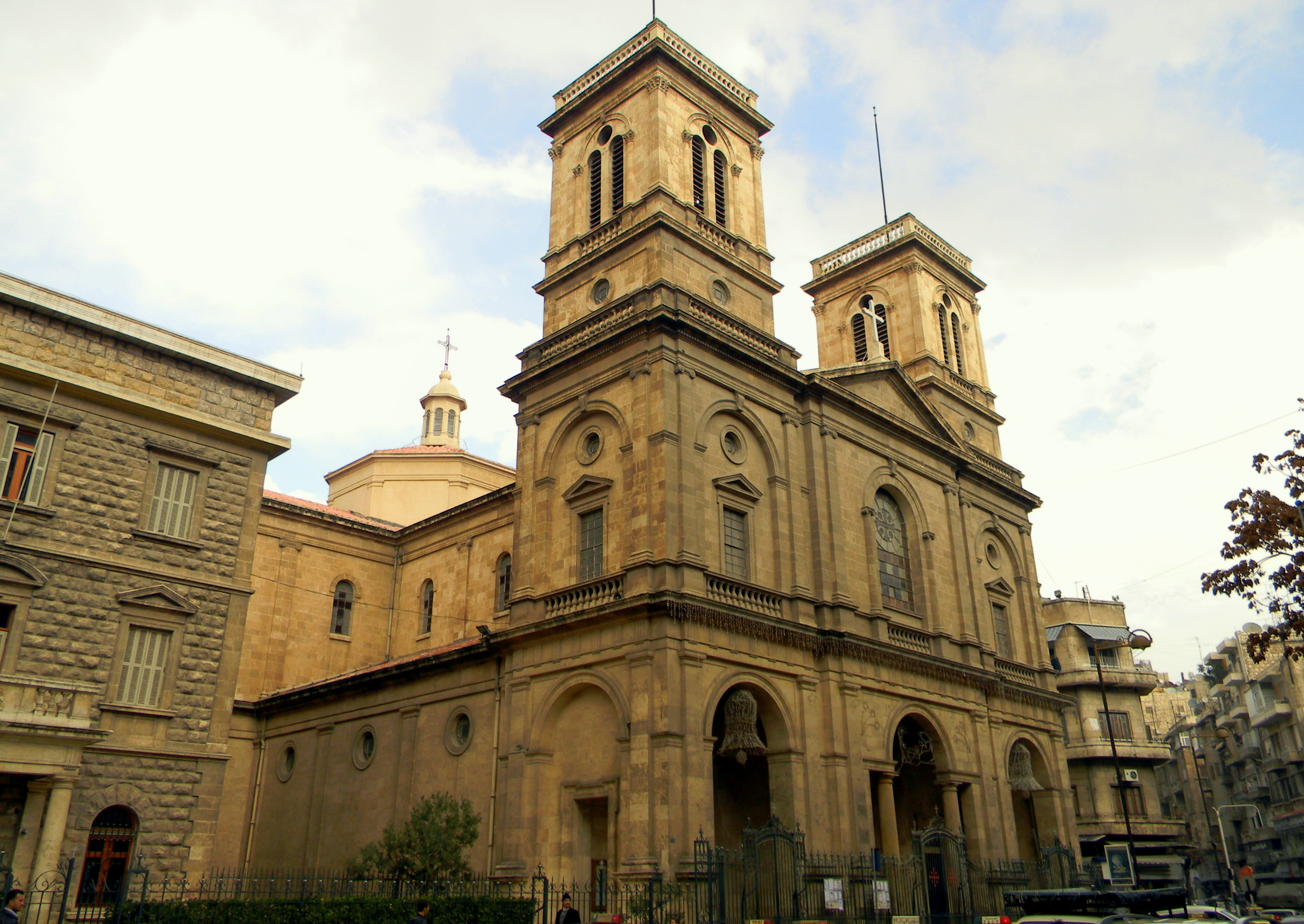
- Saint Francis of Assisi Church
- Location: Aleppo
- Country: Syria
- Denomination: Catholic Church
- Sui iuris church: Latin Church

History
- Consecrated: 1937

Architecture
- Architectural type: Neo-Renaissance

Administration
- Diocese: Apostolic Vicariate of Aleppo

Saint Francis of Assisi Church (Arabic: كنيسة القديس فرنسيس الأسيزي) also called the Latin church of Aleppo, is a Catholic church in Aleppo, Syria, operating under the regulation of the Apostolic Vicariate of Aleppo. It was the cathedral of the vicarate and the seat of the bishop until 2011, when the new Cathedral of the Child Jesus was consecrated in the city.

The church is part of the Latin Church and is dedicated to St. Francis of Assisi, and is the seat of the Apostolic Vicariate of Aleppo (Latin: Vicariatus Apostolicus Aleppensis) which was created in 1762 by Pope Clement XIII. As of 2004, 12,000 people had been baptized there. The cathedral is neo-classical style. It is maintained by the Franciscans.

It is under the pastoral responsibility of Bishop Georges Abou Khazen.

== See also ==
- Catholic Church in Syria
- St. Francis of Assisi
