= Assadourian =

Surname list

Assadourian is a surname. Notable people with the surname include:

- Éric Assadourian (born 1966), Armenian footballer
- Kevork Assadourian (born 1961), Syrian Armenian Catholic bishop
- Sarkis Assadourian (born 1948), Armenian-Canadian politician
- Sarkis Assadourian (born 1948), Armenian fencer
