= Church of the Holy Trinity, Aleppo =

Armenian Catholic church in Aleppo, Syria

Holy Trinity Church Սուրբ Երրորդութիւն Եկեղեցի كنيسة الثالوث الأقدس
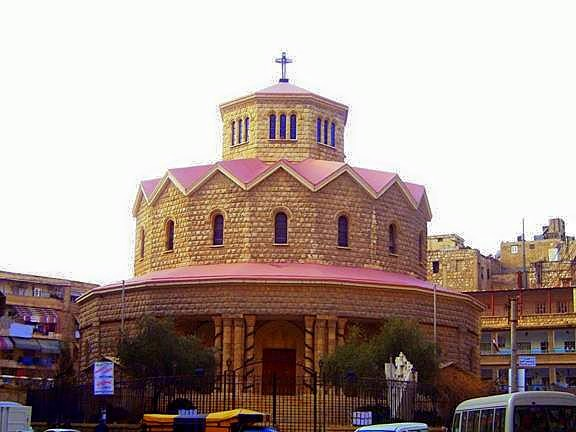

Religion
- Affiliation: Armenian Catholic Church; Armenian Catholic Archeparchy of Aleppo
- Year consecrated: 1965
- Status: Active

Location
- Location: Aleppo, Syria
- Interactive map of Holy Trinity Church; Սուրբ Երրորդութիւն Եկեղեցի كنيسة الثالوث الأقدس
- Coordinates: 36.2208°N 37.1633°E

Architecture
- Architect: Pascal Paboudjian
- Type: Armenian
- Style: Circular (Zvartnots-style)
- Dome: 1

The Holy Trinity Church (Armenian: Սուրբ Երրորդութիւն Եկեղեցի, Sourp Yerrortutyun; Arabic: كنيسة الثالوث الأقدس), also called Zvartnots, is an Armenian Catholic church in al-Midan district of Aleppo, Syria.

== Overview ==
The consecration of the church took place in 1965, on the occasion of the 50th anniversary of the Armenian genocide and was renovated in 1990. Its structure resembles the one of Zvartnots in Armenia. The architect of the church is Pascal Paboudjian.

The Zvartnots primary school known in Arabic as al-Farah School (Arabic: مدرسة الفرح) located within the church complex, belongs to the Armenian Catholic Archeparchy of Aleppo, operating from kindergarten to 9th grade.

== See also ==
- Armenians in Syria
- List of churches in Aleppo
