= Boutros Marayati =

Syrian Armenian Catholic archbishop (born 1948)

Most Reverend Boutros Marayati
- Archbishop of Aleppo
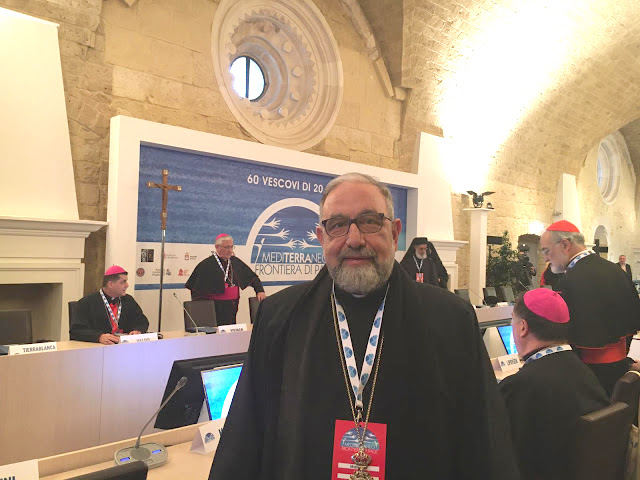
- Archbishop Marayati in Bari in 2020
- Native name: Պետրոս Միրիաթեան
- Church: Armenian Catholic Church
- Archdiocese: Aleppo
- Province: Cilicia
- Installed: 21 August 1989
- Predecessor: Joseph Basmadjan
- Other posts: Patriarchal Administrator of Cilicia (2021); Apostolic Administrator of Qamishli (1992–2022)

Orders
- Ordination: 4 July 1971
- Consecration: 4 February 1990 by Hovhannes Bedros XVIII Kasparian, André Bedoglouyan, Vartan Achkarian

Personal details
- Born: Boutros Marayati; 26 February 1948 (age 78) Aleppo, First Syrian Republic

Boutros Marayati (Armenian: Պետրոս Միրիաթեան; born 26 February 1948) is a Syrian Armenian Catholic hierarch. Since 1989, he has served as the Archbishop of Aleppo. He also served as the Patriarchal Administrator of the Armenian Catholic Church in 2021 following the death of Patriarch Krikor Bedros XX Ghabroyan.

== Biography ==
Boutros Marayati was born in Aleppo, Syria, on 26 February 1948. He was ordained to the priesthood on 4 July 1971.

On 21 August 1989, the Synod of the Armenian Catholic Church elected him as the Archbishop of Aleppo, a decision that received the confirmation of Pope John Paul II on the same day. He was consecrated as a bishop on 4 February 1990 by Patriarch Hovhannes Bedros XVIII Kasparian, assisted by Bishops André Bedoglouyan and Vartan Achkarian.

In addition to his duties in Aleppo, Marayati was appointed the Apostolic Administrator sede vacante of the Armenian Catholic Eparchy of Qamishli on 10 April 1992, a position he held for several decades, until 20 August 2022.

During the Syrian civil war, Marayati remained in Aleppo, providing pastoral care and humanitarian leadership to the Christian community. He frequently participated in international dialogues regarding the plight of Eastern Christians and met with high-ranking church leaders. In January 2003, Marayati served as a member of the Catholic delegation for the preparatory committee meeting of the International Joint Commission for Theological Dialogue Between the Catholic Church and the Oriental Orthodox Churches held in Rome, and in 2011, he was appointed a member of the Pontifical Council for Interreligious Dialogue.

On 26 May 2021, following the death of Patriarch Krikor Bedros XX Ghabroyan, Marayati was appointed Patriarchal Administrator of the Armenian Catholic Church as the senior bishop by ordination. His primary responsibility was to oversee the administrative transition and convene the Synod of Bishops to elect a successor. In September 2021, he participated in the Elective Synod of the Armenian Catholic Church convened by Pope Francis at the Pontifical Armenian College in Rome. He was part of the body of bishops that elected Raphaël Bedros XXI Minassian as the new Patriarch of Cilicia and served in position of the Patriarchal Administrator until 24 October 2021.
