= Krikor Ayvazian =

Krikor Ayvazian (b. Marash, Ottoman Empire 27 June 1912 - d. Aleppo, Syria 21 January 1997) was the Armenian Catholic Bishop of Qamishli.

== Life ==
Krikor Ayvazian was ordained on 6 September 1936, as a priest in the Armenian Catholic Church. On December 6, 1972, he received the appointment as Bishop of Qamishli for the Armenian Catholics and was consecrated on 25 February 1973 by the hand of Armenian Catholic Ignatius Bedros XVI Batanian, Catholicos-Patriarch of Cilicia of the Armenian Catholic Church. The co-consecrators Archbishop Georges Layek of Aleppo, Syria and Bishop Raphaël Bayan of Alexandria, Egypt.

Bishop Ayvazian served as Bishop of Qamishli for 16 years and retired on 18 November 1988 as Bishop Emeritus of Qamishli and was succeeded by Joseph Arnaouti as new Bishop of Qamishli. Upon retirement on 23 November 1988 he was appointed titular bishop of Marash. He died on 21 January 1997 in Aleppo and was buried there. He authored a great number of publications including recounting his beginnings in Marash (in Turkish Kahramanmaraş), Cilicia (Turkey).

== See also ==
- Catholic Church in Syria
