= Hanna Jallouf =

Syrian prelate

Coat of arms of Hanna Jallouf

Hanna Jallouf OFM (born July 16, 1952 ) is a Syrian Catholic titular bishop. He has been the Apostolic Vicar of Aleppo since 2023. As the vicar, he is the head of the Apostolic Vicariate of Aleppo, which is part of the Latin Church and distinct from the Eastern Catholic Churches in Syria, and leader of the Latin Catholics throughout Syria.

== Biography ==
Hanna Jallouf was born in kenaeh, Syria, on July 16, 1952. He joined the Congregation of the Franciscan on February 17, 1979, and made his perpetual vows and received on July 29, 1979, he was ordained to the priesthood.

In 2014, Fr. Hanna Jallouf was kidnapped with around 20 of his parishioners while in Knayeh by members of the al-Qaeda-affiliated al-Nusra Front. He was held captive for five days.

Pope Francis appointed him Vicar Apostolic of Aleppo on July 1, 2023, after the resignation of Georges Abou Khazen from the role. His episcopal ordination was made by the Prefect of the Dicastery for the Eastern Churches Cardinal Claudio Gugerotti on September 17, 2023. At the time of his appointment, he had served for 22 years as a bishop.

== See also ==
- Catholic Church in Syria
- Ephraim Maalouli
