= Aresti =

Aresti or Arestis is a surname. The name originates from Cyprus, Sardinia and Euskadi/the Basque Country. Arestis is both a first name and surname in Cyprus, related to the Ancient Greek name Orestes. Notable people with the surname include:

- Alexandros Aresti (born 1983), Cypriot swimmer
- Antonis Aresti (born 1983), Cypriot athlete and Paralympian
- Christina Arestis British/Cypriot ballerina with The Royal Ballet
- Frank Aresti (born 1967), American guitarist and composer
- Gabriel Aresti (1933–1975), Basque writer and poet
- Georgios Aresti (born 1994), Cypriot footballer
- Giovanni Battista Aresti de Dovara, Roman Catholic Archbishop of Aleppo
- Professor Philip Arestis, Cypriot economist and academic, Professor and Senior Emeritus Fellow at the Cambridge Centre for Economics and Public Policy, Department of Land Economy, University of Cambridge, UK
- Simone Aresti (born 1986), Sardinian footballer

See also

- Aresti Catalog, is the Fédération Aéronautique Internationale (FAI) standards document enumerating the aerobatic manoeuvers permitted in aerobatic competition
