= Archeparchy of Aleppo =

Archeparchy of Aleppo may refer to:

- Syriac Catholic Archeparchy of Aleppo
- Armenian Catholic Archeparchy of Aleppo
- Maronite Catholic Archeparchy of Aleppo
- Melkite Greek Catholic Archeparchy of Aleppo
