= Ordinariate for Eastern Catholics in Poland =

Catholic ecclesiastical jurisdiction in Poland

Location
- Country: Poland

Statistics
- Population: (as of 2013); 670
- Parishes: 3

Information
- Established: 18 September 1981

Current leadership
- Pope: Leo XIV
- Bishop: Adrian Joseph Galbas
- Bishops emeritus: Kazimierz Nycz

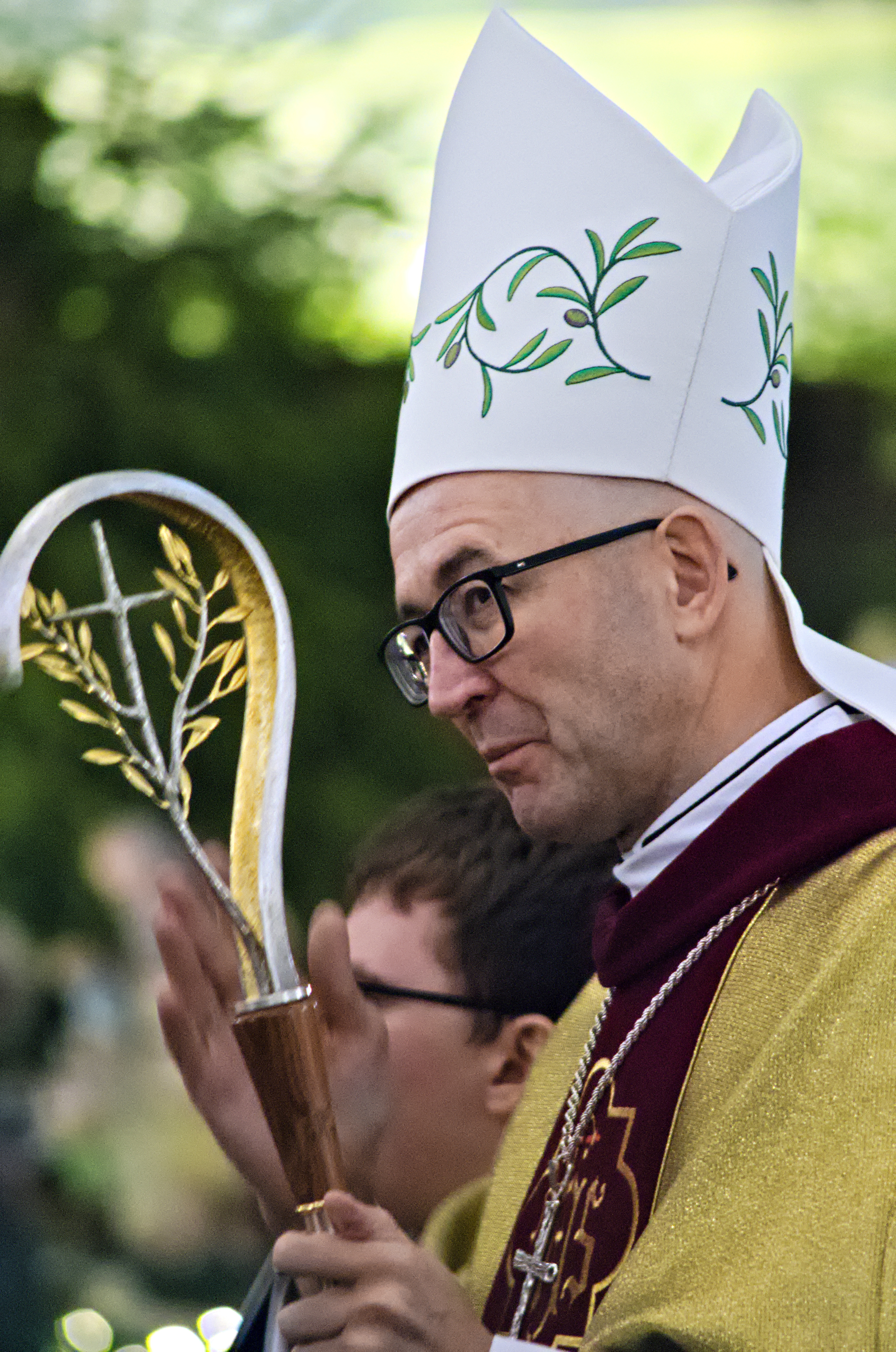
Archbishop Adrian Joseph Galbas, ordinary of Poland.

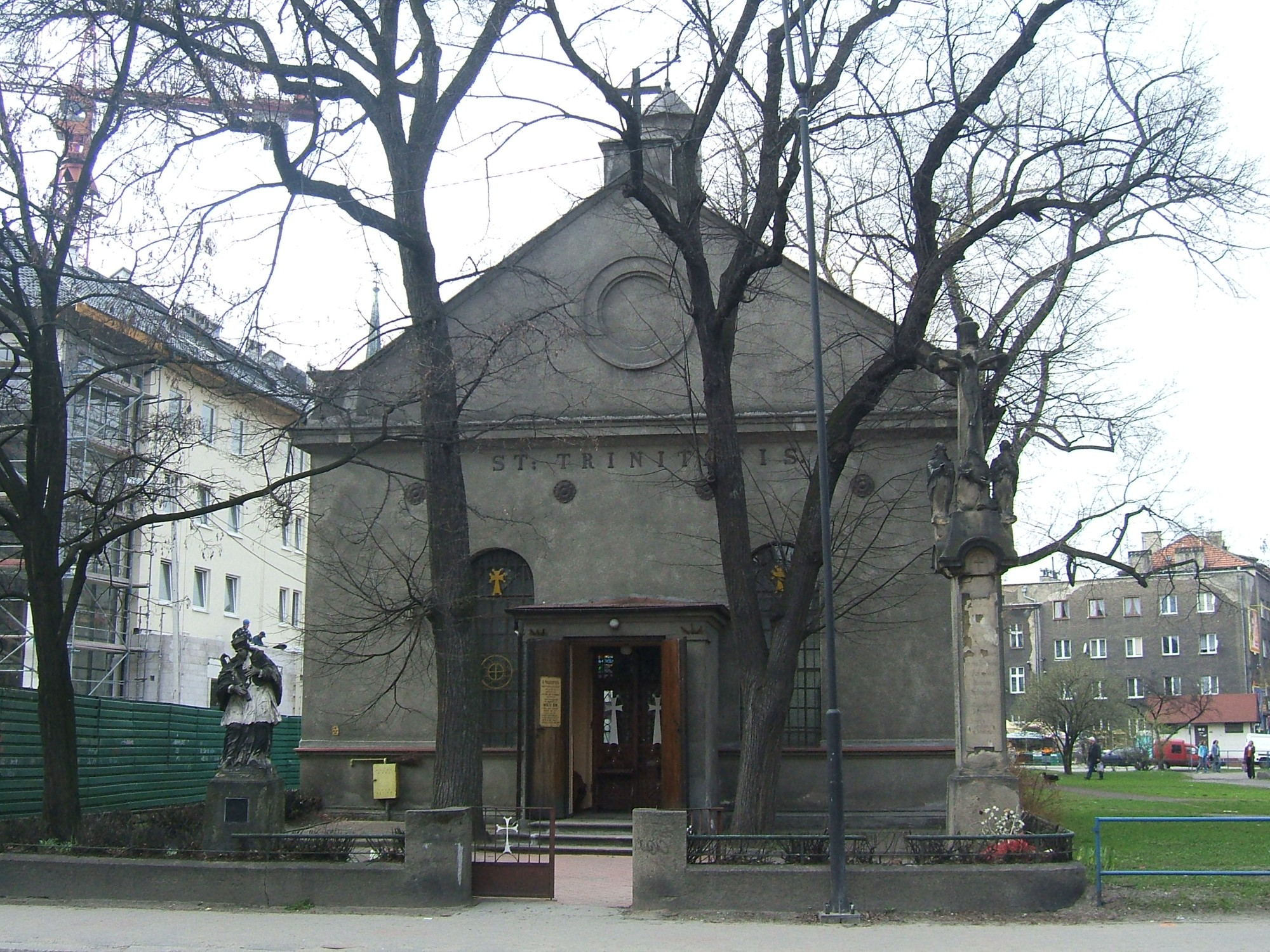
Armenian Parochial Church of Gliwice.

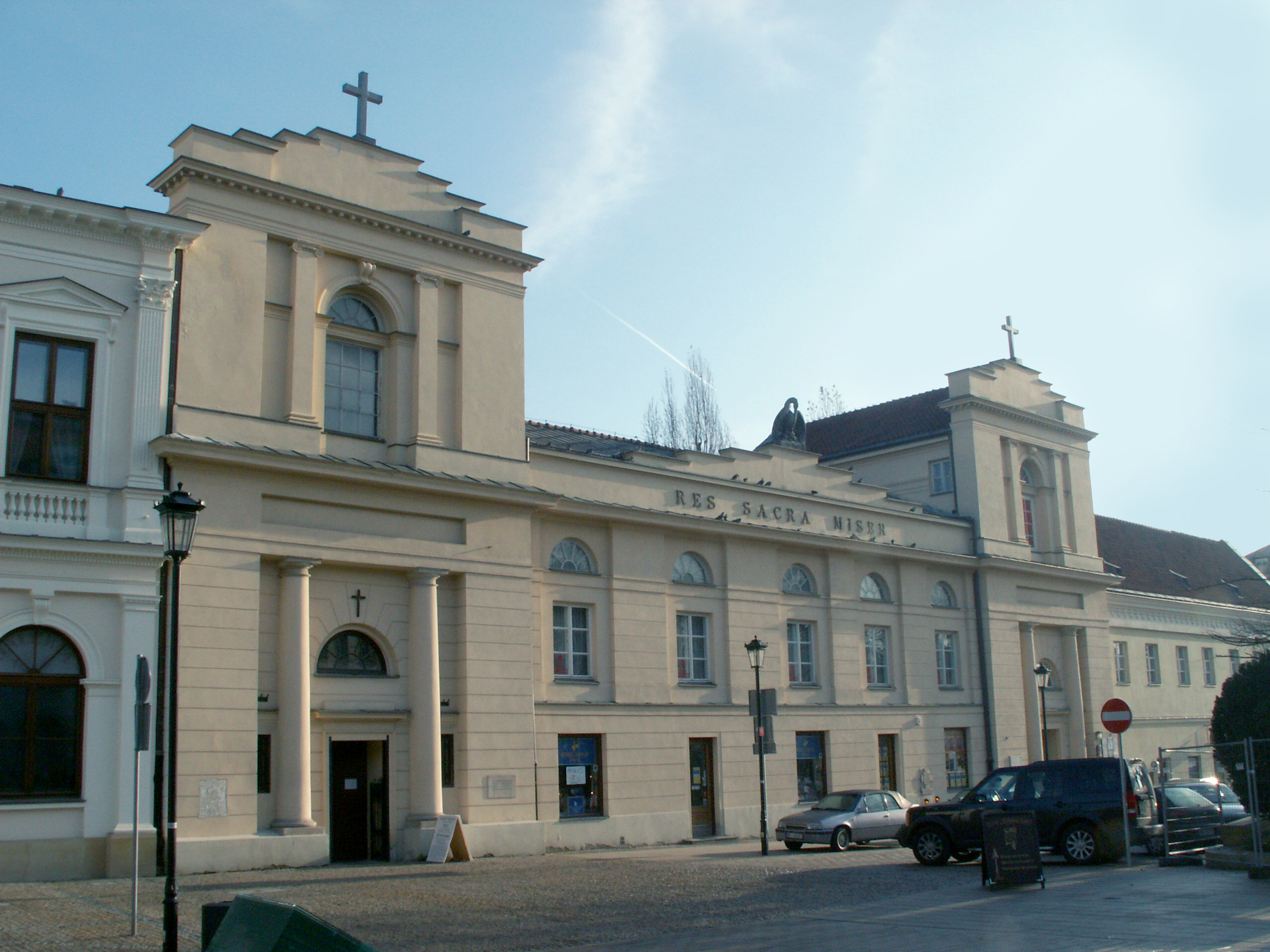
Armenian Parochial Church of Warsaw.

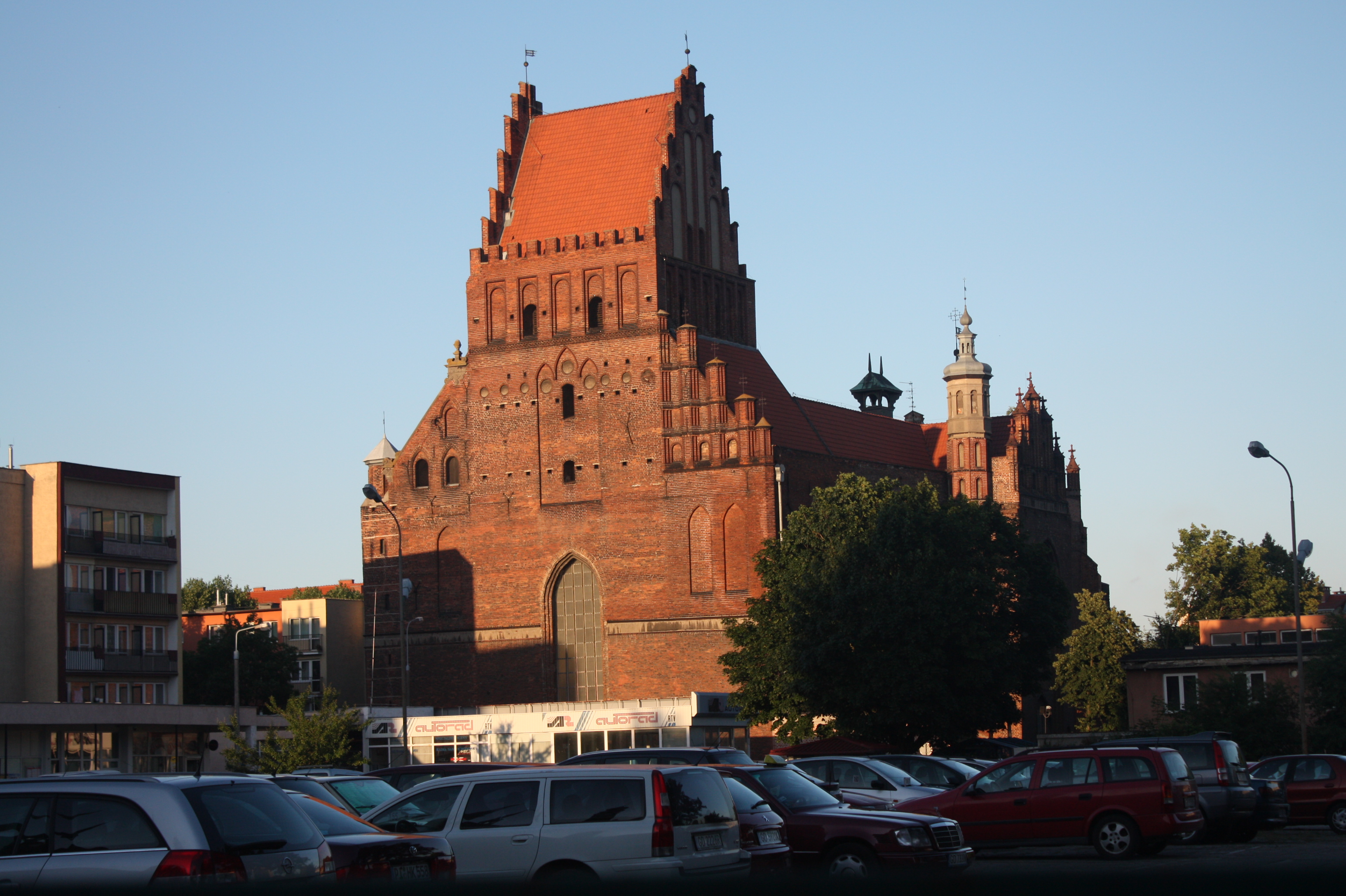
Armenian Parochial Church of Gdansk.

The Ordinariate for Eastern Catholics in Poland (Polish Ordynariat dla wiernych obrządku wschodniego) is the Ordinariate for Eastern Catholic faithful (an Eastern Catholic jurisdiction within a country's Latin Church hierarchy) for the members of Eastern Catholic particular churches sui iuris in Poland without their own jurisdiction. Currently it serves only Armenian Catholics in 3 parishes.

== History ==
In September 18, 1981, it was established as the Ordinariate of Poland for Byzantine Rite and Armenian Catholics by Pope John Paul II. The ordinariate was separate from the Archdiocese of Warszawa but vested in that see.

On 16 January 1991, following the erection of two Ukrainian Greek Catholic eparchies, the ordinariate assumed its current name and limited its jurisdiction.

As of 2007, 147 faithful of the Catholic Church of the Byzantine Catholics who belonged to a parish of Kostomłoty were entrusted to the pastoral care of the Latin Bishop of Siedlce.

Since Archbishop Nycz's decree on 1 December 2009, the ordinariate maintained jurisdiction over three churches, all for Armenian Catholics.

== Territory and statistics ==
The ordinariate is exempt, directly dependent on the Holy See (not part of any ecclesiastical province and the Roman Congregation for the Oriental Churches). It is headquartered in Warsaw (the primatial see and its ordinary is the Latin hierarch of the Archdiocese of Warsaw.

=== Parishes ===
As of 2024, there are three parishes in the Ordinariate:

- Armenian-Catholic Southern Parish in Gliwice (Holy Trinity Church)
- Armenian Catholic Central Parish in Warsaw (Church of Saint Gregory of Narek)
- Armenian Catholic Northern Parish in Gdańsk (Church of the Holy Apostles Peter and Paul)

As per 2014, its pastorally served 670 Eastern Catholics in 3 parishes and 2 missions with 4 diocesan priests.

== Episcopal ordinaries ==
- Józef Glemp (1981.09.18 – 2007.06.09)
- Kazimierz Nycz (2007.06.09 – 2025.03.08)
- Adrian Joseph Galbas (2025.03.08-present)

== Sources ==
- Annuario Pontificio, Libreria Editrice Vaticana, Città del Vaticano, 2003, ISBN 88-209-7422-3.

== External links and sources ==
- GCatholic, with Google map
- Catholic-hierarchy.org
- ordynariat.ormianie.pl
