= Apostolic Vicariate of Aleppo =

Catholic jurisdiction for Syria

Location
- Country: Syria

Statistics
- Parishes: 10
- Members: 13,000

Information
- Rite: Latin Rite
- Established: 27 June 1762
- Cathedral: Child Jesus
- Secular priests: 36

Current leadership
- Bishop: Hanna Jallouf
- Apostolic Administrator: Raimondo Girgis
- Bishops emeritus: Georges Abou Khazen

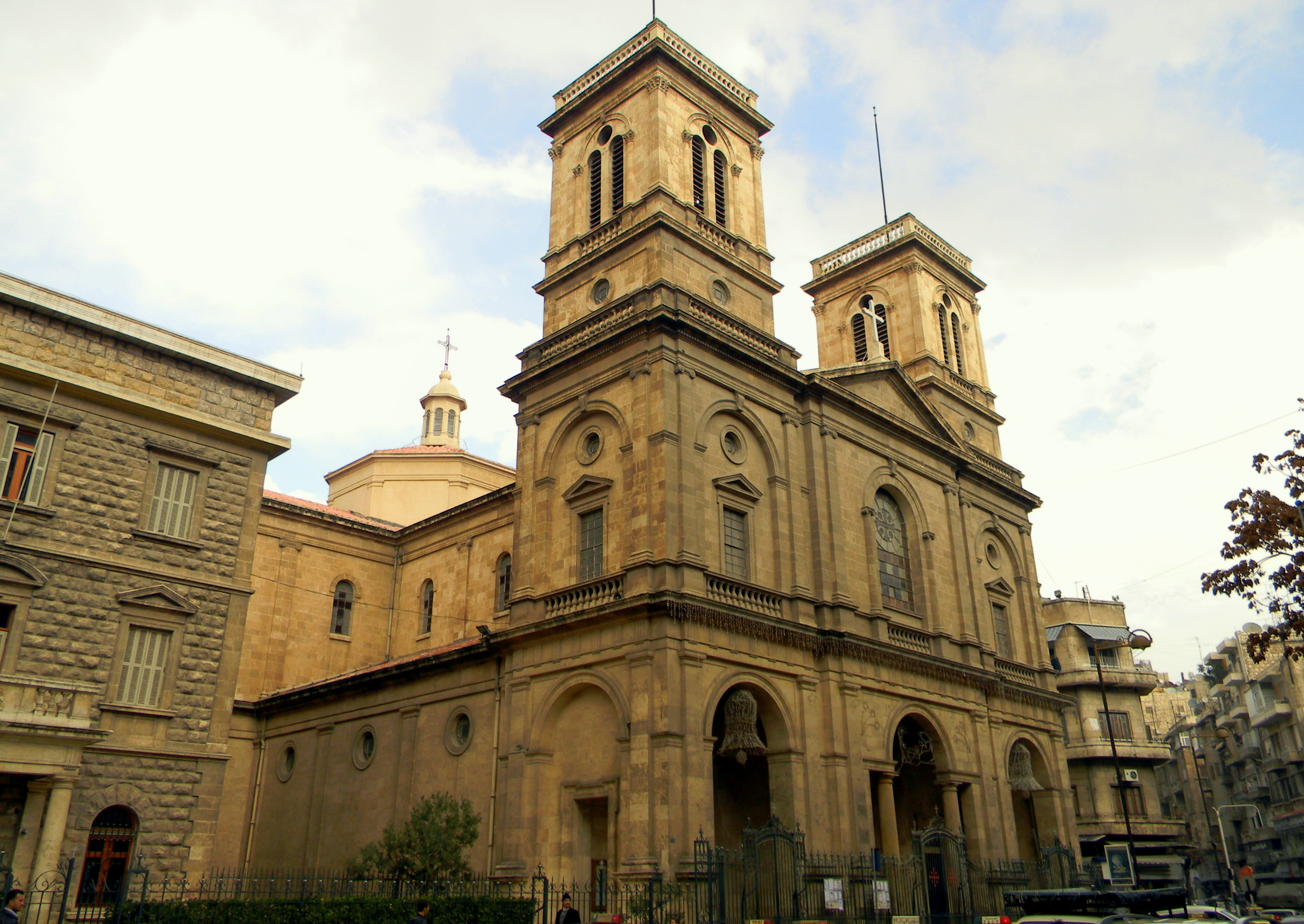
Former Latin Cathedral of Aleppo, dedicated to Saint Francis of Assisi

The Apostolic Vicariate of Aleppo (in Latin: Vicariatus Apostolicus Aleppensis) is an apostolic vicariate (Latin pre-diocesan missionary jurisdiction of the Latin Church, entitled to a titular bishop) and is immediately subject to the Holy See and its missionary Dicastery for the Eastern Churches. The vicariate has jurisdiction over Catholics of the Latin Rite throughout Syria.

The seat of the vicariate is the city of Aleppo (Halab in Arabic), Syria's greatest city before the civil war, where the Cathedral of the Child Jesus was opened by Cardinal Leonardo Sandri on 15 January 2011. Its (former?) episcopal see is the Cathedral of St. Francis of Assisi in Aleppo.

Together with the Eastern Catholic hierarchs of five rite-specific Catholic churches (Melkite, Syriac, Maronite, Chaldean and Armenian) the Apostolic Vicar of Aleppo is part of the Assembly of Catholic Ordinaries in Syria (A.H.C.S.). The Apostolic Vicar is also a member of the Conference of the Latin Bishops of the Arab Regions.

== Statistics ==
The Apostolic Vicariate extends its jurisdiction over the Catholics of the Latin Rite of all Syria, as per 2014 pastorally serving 13,000 Catholics in 10 parishes and 6 missions with 38 priests (religious) and 243 lay religious (46 brothers, 197 sisters).

== History ==
From the early decades of the seventeenth century some religious orders, particularly the Order of the Friars Minor Capuchin, the Carmelites and the Society of Jesus, settled in Syria and Aleppo. There were several conversions to Catholicism of the Latin rite, and this led Congregation for the Evangelization of Peoples to establish a diocese in Aleppo.

The first attempt to establish an apostolic vicariate (a pre-diocesan mission under a titular bishop) was in 1645. On 31 July 1645 the Franciscan Giovanni Battista Dovara was appointed as bishop; however, "that he had achieved such a dignity, otherwise do not bother to go to his residence, despite the replicated excitations that he was moved by the Holy Congregation. Nor from that time on he was thought to depute a Latin bishop in that city". The early vicariate therefore failed and jurisdiction over the Latin church returned to the Custodian of the Holy Land (traditionally a Franciscan), as it was previously.

The Apostolic Vicariate of Aleppo was erected properly (the 'second' time) on 27 June 1762, when Pope Clement XIII appointed the Congregation of the Mission member Frenchman Arnaud Bossu, who had been Apostolic Vicar of Algiers. In a Papal brief, Bossu received the title of Vicar Apostolic of Aleppo, with jurisdiction over the Eastern Europeans and the Latin Rite of the patriarchates of Antioch and Jerusalem, including the Maronite and Armenian patriarchates. The vicar, however, did not establish his residence in Aleppo, but at Antoura in Lebanon, and never received episcopal consecration. Also on this occasion, the vicariate was short-lived due to the Suppression of the Jesuit Order in 1773 and the French Revolution, which, among other consequences, involved the removal of all French religious orders not only in motherland, but also in mission lands.

After the Congress of Vienna (1814-1815, to settle Europe after the defeat of Naopoleon I Bonaparte), the missionary Roman Congregation for the Evangelization of Peoples restored the apostolic vicariate in 1817, with the name of the Apostolic Vicariate of Syria, Egypt, Arabia and Cyprus. It had jurisdiction over much of Catholic missions of the central and southern regions of the Ottoman Empire, namely: Syria, Lebanon, Cyprus, Palestine, the Arabian Peninsula, Egypt, Abyssinia (then empire of Ethiopia including Eritrea) and Nubia (Anglo-Egyptian Sudan and southernmost Egypt). Also included was the south-central part of Anatolia, including the cities of Antioch (Antakya) and Alexandretta (Iskenderun).

On 15 August 1824 the Coptic Catholic Patriarchate of Alexandria was established, drawing on part of the vicariate's territory.

Following a decision of Pope Gregory XVI in 1837, the vicariate was divided into two on 18 May 1839, with the establishment of the Apostolic Vicariate of Egypt and Arabia (today the Apostolic Vicariate of Alexandria of Egypt) and the Apostolic Prefecture of Abyssinia (today Ethiopian Catholic Archeparchy of Addis Abeba in the Ethiopian rite). The name of the Apostolic Vicariate of Aleppo dates from this time.

On October 4, 1847, it ceded Palestine, Cyprus and the areas corresponding to (the current / (Trans)Jordan for the restoration of the Latin Patriarchate of Jerusalem.

With the end of the Ottoman Empire, the birth of modern Turkey (1923) and especially with the passage of Hatay from Syria to Turkey (1938), under the Papal bull of Pope Pius XII, Ad maius christifidelium of 5 October 1939 and Quo sacrorum of 9 December 1939, the Vicariate Apostolic of Aleppo lost the Turkish territories that passed to the Apostolic Vicariate of Istanbul.

On June 4, 1953, it gave another portion of territory for the creation of the Apostolic Vicariate of Beirut. From this moment the Vicariate Apostolic of Aleppo geographically corresponding to the Arab republic of Syria's territory. Only from this territorial change, the apostolic vicars have permanent residence in Aleppo, preferring previously reside in Lebanon.

== Episcopal ordinaries ==
Until 2013, Europeans or members of missionary Latin congregations, mostly Franciscans, were ordinaries here. All have belonged to the Roman rite.

Apostolic Vicars of Aleppo

- Giovanni Battista Aresti de Dovara, O.F.M. (31 July 1645 – 1659 resigned).
- Vacant (1659–1672)
- Arnaud Bossu, C.M. (17 June 1762 – 20 November 1765 resigned)
- Vacant (1765–1818)

Apostolic Vicars of Syria, Egypt, Arabia and Cyprus

- Aloisio Gandolfi, C.M. (13 January 1818 – death 25 August 1825), Titular Bishop of Icosium (1815.08.11 – 1825.08.25), also Apostolic Delegate to Syria (1815.08.11 – 1825.08.25)
- Giovanni Pietro Losana (23 January 1827 – 30 September 1833), later Bishop of Biella (?)
- Jean-Baptiste Auvergne (March 29, 1833 – death September 14, 1836), Titular Archbishop of Iconium (1833.03.29 – 1836.09.14), also Apostolic Delegate to Egypt and Arabia (1833.03 – 1836.09.14) and Apostolic Delegate to Syria (1833.03 – 1836.09.14)
- Angelo Giuseppe Fazio, Capuchin Franciscans (O.F.M. Cap.) (15 December 1837 – death 13 December 1838), Titular Bishop of Tipasa (1836.04.26 – 1838.12.13) (coadjutor of Tibet-Hindustan, British India, 1836.04.26 – 1837.12.15); also Apostolic Delegate to Syria (1837.12.15 – 1838.12.13)

Apostolic Vicars of Aleppo

- Villardel Francisco, O.F.M. (8 March 1839 – death 19 June 1852), Titular Archbishop of Philippi (1839.03.08 – 1852.06.19), also Apostolic Delegate to Syria (1839.03.08 – 1852.06.19)
- Paul Brunoni (July 4, 1853 – November 23, 1858), Titular Archbishop of Tharona (1853.07.12 – 1868.06.25), ? appointed Apostolic Vicar of Constantinople), later Latin Titular Patriarch of Antioch (1868.06.25 – 1877.01.02)
- Giuseppe Valerga (1858 – death 2 December 1872 deceased) (apostolic administrator)
- Serafino Milani, O.F.M. (23 January 1874 – 21 December 1874 appointed Bishop of Pontremoli) (bishop-elect)
- Luigi Piavi, O.F.M. (November 13, 1876 – August 28, 1889), Titular Archbishop of Siunia (1876.11.18 – 1889.08.28), also Apostolic Delegate to Syria (1876.11.13 – 1889.08.28); later residential Latin Patriarch of Jerusalem of the Latins (Palestine) (1889.08.28 – death 1905.01.24) and Grand Master of Equestrian Order of the Holy Sepulchre of Jerusalem (1889.08.28 – 1905.01.24)
  - Auxiliary Bishop Gaudenzio Bonfigli, O.F.M. (18 August 1890 – 25 February 1896), Titular Bishop of Casium (1881.08.19 – 1890.08.19), later Apostolic Delegate to Syria (1890.08.19 – 1896.02.25) and Titular Archbishop of Cabassa (1890.08.19 – 1904.04.06), Apostolic Delegate to Egypt and Arabia (1896.02.25 – 1904.04.06)
- Pierre Gonzales Charles Duval, O.P. (February 25, 1896 – death July 31, 1904), Titular Archbishop of Petra (1895.11.29 – 1904.07.31), also Apostolic Delegate to Syria (1896.02.25 – 1904.07.31)
- Frediano Giannini, O.F.M. (20 January 1905 – resigned February 12, 1936), also Apostolic Delegate to Syria (1905.01.16 – 1935), Titular Archbishop of Serræ (1905.01.16 – 1939.10.25); earlier Custos of the Holy Land (1900 – 1906); later Vice-Chamberlain of the Holy Roman Church (1936 – death 1939)
- Vacant seat (1936–1967)
  - Apostolic administrator Akiki Bonaventure, O.F.M. (28 June 1967 – 1 March 1973), Titular Bishop of Larissa in Syria (1973.03.01 – death 1987.09.09), no previous prelature
- Akiki Bonaventure, O.F.M. (1 March 1973 – 1979 Retired)
- Guerino Domenico Picchi, O.F.M. (20 June 1980 – 9 July 1992 Retired), Titular Bishop of Sebaste in Palæstina (1980.06.20 – death 1997.07.19)
- Armando Bortolaso, S.D.B. (9 July 1992 – 21 November 2002 Retired), Titular Bishop of Raphanea (1992.07.09 – ...)
- Giuseppe Nazzaro, O.F.M. (21 November 2002 – 15 April 2013 Retired), Titular Bishop of Forma (2002.11.21 – death 2015.10.26); previously Custos of the Holy Land (1992.04.10 [1992.05.08] – 1998.01.16)
  - Apostolic Administrator Georges Abou Khazen, O.F.M. (15 April 2013 – 4 November 2013), Titular Bishop of Rusadus (from 4 November 2013)
- Georges Abou Khazen, O.F.M. (4 November 2013 – retired 29 June 2022)
- Hanna Jallouf, O.F.M. (17 September 2023 – present)

== See also ==
- Catholic Church in Syria

== Sources and external links ==
- gcatholic.org - data for all sections
- http://www.catholic-hierarchy.org/diocese/dalep.html
- https://www.vatican.va/archive/aas/documents/AAS%2032%20%5B1940%5D%20-%20ocr.pdf, AAS 32 (1940), p. 115
- Pius Bonifacius Gams, https://www.vatican.va/archive/aas/documents/AAS%2032%20%5B1940%5D%20-%20ocr.pdf, AAS 32 (1940), p. 116
- Hubert Jedin, ed. (2002). Storia della Chiesa. Vol. VIII/1. Jaca Book. pp. 181–186. ISBN 9788816302495.
- C. Karalevsky, v. Alep, in, https://books.google.com/books?id=bVRRHogVx0sC vol. XII, Parigi 1953, coll. 110-112 e 114-115
- http://gallica.bnf.fr/ark:/12148/bpt6k6561037d/f73.image
- Latin Parish of St. Francis, Aleppo (in Arabic)
