= Nazarro =

Nazarro is a surname. Notable people with the name include:

- Cliff Nazarro (1904–1961), American actor and comedian
- Ray Nazarro (1902–1986), American film and television director, producer, and screenwriter

== See also ==
- Navarro (surname)
- Nazzaro
