= Georges Abou Khazen =

Georges Abou Khazen, OFM (born on 3 August 1947 in Aïn Zebdeh, Lebanon) was the Apostolic Vicar of Aleppo.

== Life ==
Georges Abou Khazen joined the Congregation of the Franciscan on 3 August 1972, and made his perpetual vows and received on 28 June 1973 his ordination to the priesthood.

Pope Francis appointed him on 4 November 2013 Vicar Apostolic of Aleppo and Titular Bishop of Rusadus after the resignation of his predecessor Giuseppe Nazzaro as Apostolic Administrator. His episcopal ordination was made by Cardinal Prefect of the Congregation for the Oriental Churches, Cardinal Leonardo Sandri on 11 January of the following year. He was replaced in the position by Hanna Jallouf in 2023.
