= Ordinariate for Eastern Catholic faithful =

Geographical ecclesiastical structure for Eastern Catholic communities

An ordinariate for the faithful of Eastern rite is a geographical ecclesiastical structure for Eastern Catholic communities in areas where no eparchy of their own particular Church has been established. This structure was introduced by the apostolic letter Officium supremi Apostolatus of 15 July 1912.

In the Annuario Pontificio the eight existing ordinariates of this kind are listed together with the fifteen (pre-diocesan) apostolic exarchates. Of these ordinariates, four (in Argentina, Brazil, France and Poland) are generically for all Eastern Catholics who lack a 'proper' diocesan jurisdiction of their own rite in the particular country and who are therefore entrusted to the care of a Latin Archbishop in the country. The one in Austria is for Catholics belonging to any of the fourteen particular Churches that use the Byzantine Rite. The other three (Ex-Soviet 'Eastern Europe', Greece and Romania) are exclusively for members of the Armenian Catholic Church.

== Existing ordinariates ==
Ordinariate	Geographical area	Jurisdiction	Cathedral see	Ordinary	Date(s) of founding
Ordinariate for Eastern Catholics in Argentina	Argentina	All Eastern Catholics	now Buenos Aires	Metropolitan Archbishop of Buenos Aires	1959-02-19
Ordinariate for Catholics of Byzantine Rite in Austria	Austria	All Eastern Catholics	Vienna	vested in the Metropolitan Archbishop of Vienna	1945-10-03 and 1956-06-13
Ordinariate for Eastern Catholics in Brazil	Brazil	All Eastern Catholics	presently Belo Horizonte	Metropolitan Archbishop of Belo Horizonte	1951-11-14
Ordinariate for Catholics of Armenian Rite in Eastern Europe	only Armenia, Georgia, Russia and Ukraine	Armenian Rite Catholics	Gyumri (Armenia)	Armenian bishop of a titular see	1991-07-13
Ordinariate for Eastern Catholics in France	France	All Eastern Catholics	Paris	vested in the Metropolitan Archbishop of Paris	1954-06-16
Ordinariate for Catholics of Armenian Rite in Greece	Greece	Armenian Rite Catholics	Athens	vacant (under an apostolic administrator)	1925-12-21
Ordinariate for Eastern Catholics in Poland	Poland	All Eastern Catholics	Warsaw	vested in the Metropolitan Archbishop of Warsaw	1991-01-16
Ordinariate for Catholics of Armenian Rite in Romania	Romania	Armenian Rite Catholics	Gherla	vacant (under an apostolic administrator)	1930-06-05
Ordinariate for Eastern Catholics in Spain	Spain	All Eastern Catholics	none yet	Metropolitan Archbishop of Madrid	2016-06-09

== Former ordinariates ==
- Ordinariate of the Albanians in Sicily, established in 1784, was promoted to Italo-Albanese Catholic Eparchy of Piana degli Albanesi in 1937.
- Ordinariate of Poland for Greek and Armenian Catholics, established in 1981, became the present all-rites Ordinariate for Eastern Catholics in Poland in 1991.

== See also ==
- Exarch(ate)
- List of Catholic dioceses (structured view)
- Military ordinariate
- Personal ordinariate
