= Armando Bortolaso =

Italian Catholic titular bishop (1926–2019)

Armando Bortolaso (17 August 1926 – 8 January 2019) was an Italian Catholic titular bishop.

== Early life ==
Bortolaso was born in Italy and was ordained to the priesthood in 1953. He served as titular bishop of Rapahamae and was bishop of the Apostolic Vicariate of Aleppo, Syria, from 1992 to 2002.
