= Vartan Achkarian =

Vartan Achkarian (January 22, 1936 – July 28, 2012) was the Armenian Catholic titular bishop of Tokat degli Armeni and auxiliary bishop of Beirut.

Ordained to the priesthood in 1961, Achkarian became bishop in 1987 and retired in 2011.
