= Armenian Catholic Patriarchal Exarchate of Damascus =

Eastern Catholic missionary jurisdiction in Syria

Coordinates: 33.5131°N 36.3136°E

Patriarchal Exarchate of Damascus Damascenus Դամասկոսի թեմ

Location
- Country: Syria
- Metropolitan: Patriarchate of Cilicia
- Headquarters: Damascus, Syria

Statistics
- Population: (as of 2022); 4,500
- Parishes: 1

Information
- Denomination: Armenian Catholic Church
- Sui iuris church: Armenian Catholic Church
- Rite: Armenian Rite
- Established: 6 November 1984; 41 years ago
- Cathedral: Church of the Queen of the Universe in Damascus
- Secular priests: 1 Religious Orders

Current leadership
- Pope: Leo XIV
- Patriarch: Raphaël Bedros XXI Minassian, I.C.P.B.
- Patriarchal Exarch: Kevork Assadourian, I.C.P.B.

The Armenian Catholic Patriarchal Exarchate of Damascus is a pre-diocesan missionary jurisdiction of the Armenian Catholic Church sui iuris (Eastern Catholic, Armenian Rite in Armenian language) in part of Syria.

It depends directly on the Armenian Catholic Patriarch of Cilicia, without belonging to his or any other ecclesiastical province.

Its see is the Marian Church of the Queen of the Universe, in the Syrian national capital Damascus.

== History ==
Established on 6 November 1984 as Patriarchal Exarchate of Damascus (Arabic Aš-Šām).

== Ordinaries ==
(all Armenian Rite)

Patriarchal Exarchs of Damascus

- Kevork Tayroyan (1984 – 1997)
- Joseph Arnaouti, I.C.P.B. (1997 – December 2023), resigned
- Kevork Assadourian, I.C.P.B. (December 2023 – Present)

== See also ==
- Catholic Church in Syria
