= Giovanni Battista Aresti de Dovara =

Most Reverend Giovanni Battista Aresti de Dovara
- Archbishop of Aleppo
- Church: Catholic Church
- Archdiocese: Apostolic Vicariate of Aleppo
- In office: 1645–1650

Orders
- Consecration: 13 August 1645 by Alfonso Gonzaga

Giovanni Battista Aresti de Dovara, O.F.M. was a Roman Catholic prelate who served as Archbishop of Aleppo (1645–1650).

== Biography ==
Giovanni Battista Aresti de Dovara was ordained a priest in the Order of Friars Minor. On 31 July 1645, he was appointed during the papacy of Pope Innocent X as Archbishop of Aleppo. On 13 August 1645, he was consecrated bishop by Alfonso Gonzaga, Titular Archbishop of Rhodus, with Alfonso Sacrati, Bishop Emeritus of Comacchio, and Ranuccio Scotti Douglas, Bishop Emeritus of Borgo San Donnino, serving as co-consecrators. He served as Archbishop of Aleppo until his resignation in 1650.

Catholic Church titles
Preceded by	Archbishop of Aleppo; 1645–1650	Succeeded by
