= Bzoummar =

Bzoummar بزمار
- Village
- Location within Lebanon
- Coordinates: 33°59′14″N 35°40′40″E
- Country: Lebanon
- Governorate: Keserwan-Jbeil
- District: Keserwan
- Highest elevation: 950 m (3,120 ft)
- Lowest elevation: 920 m (3,020 ft)
- Time zone: UTC+2 (EET)
  - Summer (DST): UTC+3 (EEST)
- Dialing code: +961 9

Bzoummar (Arabic: بزمار, romanized: Bzummār; Western Armenian: Զմմառ Zmmar; also spelled Bzommar or Bzemmar) is a village in the Keserwan District of the Keserwan-Jbeil Governorate in Lebanon. It is 36 km (22 mi) northeast of Beirut, and has an elevation ranging between 920 and 950 m (3,020 and 3,120 ft) above sea level. Bzoummar's inhabitants are predominantly Maronite and Armenian Catholics. Bzoummar is home to a monastery of the Armenian Catholic Church that was built in 1749, where the image of Our Lady of Bzommar is venerated.
