= Kevork Assadourian =

Syrian Armenian Catholic prelate (born 1961)

The Most Reverend Kevork Assadourian ICPB
- Patriarchal Exarch of Damascus and Titular Bishop of Amida of the Armenians
- Church: Armenian Catholic Church
- Archdiocese: Cilicia
- See: Patriarchal Exarch of Damascus
- Appointed: December 2023
- Installed: 14 December 2023
- Predecessor: Joseph Arnaouti
- Other post: Auxiliary Bishop of the Patriarchal Eparchy of Beirut (2015–2023)

Orders
- Ordination: 3 October 1986 by André Bedoglouyan
- Consecration: 21 November 2015 by Gregory Peter XX Ghabroyan

Personal details
- Born: Kevork Assadourian; 29 April 1961 (age 65) Qamishli, Syria
- Residence: Damascus, Syria
- Education: Pontifical University of Saint Thomas Aquinas, Pontifical Lateran University

Kevork Assadourian, ICPB (Armenian: Գէորգ Ասատուրեան; born 29 April 1961) is a Syrian Armenian Catholic hierarch. He currently serves as the Patriarchal Exarch of Damascus (since 2023) as a Titular Bishop of Amida of the Armenians (since 2015). Previously he served as an Auxiliary Bishop of the Patriarchal Eparchy of Beirut (2015–2023).

== Early life and education ==
Kevork Assadourian was born in Qamishli, Syria, in 1961. He entered the Minor Seminary of the Patriarchal Congregation of Bzommar in 1972. He later pursued his theological and philosophical studies in Rome at the Pontifical University of Saint Thomas Aquinas (1980–1985), where he obtained a Licentiate in Theology and studied pastoral theology at the Pontifical Lateran University (1985–1986).

== Priesthood ==
He was ordained a priest on 3 October 1986 for the Patriarchal Congregation of Bzommar by Bishop André Bedoglouyan. Throughout his ministry, he held several pastoral and administrative roles, including: superior of the Armenian Catholic community in Bourj Hammoud, Lebanon; rector of the Armenian Catholic community in Paris, France (2007–2015); administrator of the Bzommar Monastery.

== Episcopal ministry ==
On 5 September 2015, Pope Francis confirmed his election by the Synod of Bishops of the Armenian Catholic Church as the Auxiliary Bishop of the Patriarchal Diocese of Cilicia. He was assigned the Titular See of Amida degli Armeni. He received his episcopal consecration on 21 November 2015 from Patriarch Gregory Peter XX Ghabroyan.

In September 2021, following the death of Patriarch Krikor Bedros XX Ghabroyan, Assadourian participated in the Elective Synod of the Armenian Catholic Church convened by Pope Francis at the Pontifical Armenian College in Rome. He was part of the body of bishops that elected Raphaël Bedros XXI Minassian as the new Patriarch of Cilicia.

Assadourian has been vocal regarding the plight of Christians in the Middle East. During the Syrian Civil War, he maintained communication with various regional stakeholders to ensure the safety of Christian communities and provided aid through organizations like Aid to the Church in Need.

In December 2023, he was elected as the Patriarchal Exarch of Damascus and was installed in Damascus on 14 December 2023.
