= San Nazzaro =

San Nazzaro may refer to the following places:

== Italy ==
- San Nazzaro, Campania, a comune in the Province of Benevento
- San Nazzaro Sesia, a comune in the Province of Novara, Piedmont
- San Nazzaro Val Cavargna, a comune in the Province of Como, Lombardy

== Switzerland ==
- San Nazzaro, Switzerland, a former comune in the Canton of Ticino
