= Giuseppe Nazzaro =

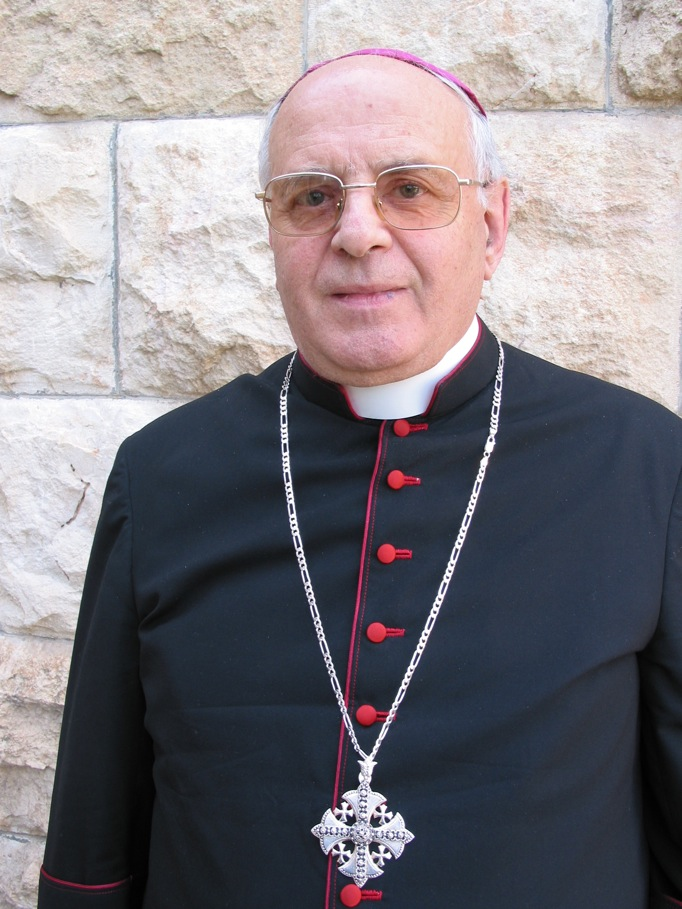
- Born: 22 December 1937; San Potito Ultra in Campania
- Died: 26 October 2015 (aged 77)
- Occupations: Italian bishop, theologian and orientalist

Giuseppe Nazzaro, OFM (22 December 1937 – 26 October 2015) was an Emeritus bishop of the Apostolic Vicariate of Aleppo, Custodian of the Holy Land and a polyglot.

== Life ==
Giuseppe Nazzaro was born on 22 December 1937 in San Potito Ultra in the Campania. In 1950, he enrolled in the Franciscan College of the Holy Land in Rome. Nazzaro continued his studies in Emmaus in Israel. His novitiate in the Order of Friars Minor began on 4 October 1956 in Bethlehem. His perpetual profession was filed on 18 December 1960. Nazzaro studied philosophy and theology at Bethlehem and Jerusalem in the Studium Theologicum Jerosolimitanum. On 29 June 1965 he obtained his ordination to the priesthood.

After a year of service in the Church of the Holy Sepulchre, Nazzaro was delegated to Aleppo in Syria. In 1968 he began his studies in the Pontifical University Antonianum. He earned an undergraduate degree in dogmatic theology. In 1971 Nazzaro was appointed parish priest in Alexandria in Egypt. Then he worked in Cairo as a guardian and pastor of Saint Joseph Church. Later, he was appointed by the Vicar Apostolic of Egypt as vicar bishop for the region of Cairo and Upper Egypt. Then he worked in Maadi and Sharm el-Sheikh as a military chaplain.

In the years 1986–1992 Nazzaro was secretary of the Custody of the Holy Land in Jerusalem, residing in the Monastery of St Saviour. In the years 1987–1992 he was also secretary of the Conference of Provincial Ministers of the Middle East and North Africa. In 1992 he was elected Custodian of the Holy Land. After the expiry of the mandate of the Custodian, Nazzaro was guardian in Naples, and from 2001 guardian and pastor of Damascus. Pope John Paul II appointed him Vicar Apostolic of Aleppo and Titular bishop of Forma on 21 November 2002. His episcopal ordination occurred by the hands of the Pope personally on 6 January next year at Saint Peter's Basilica; his co-consecrators were Leonardo Sandri, substitute of the Secretariat of State (Vatican City), and Antonio Maria Vegliò, secretary of the Congregation for the Oriental Churches.
