= Catholic Church in Syria =

The Catholic Church in Syria is part of the worldwide Catholic Church under the spiritual leadership of the Pope in Rome.

In 2020, there were 192,000 Catholics in Syria, approximately 1% of the total population. The Catholics of Syria belong to several churches of different rites/languages, mainly the Melkite, but also Armenian, Chaldean, Syriac, Maronite and the Latin Church. There are separate but overlapping jurisdictions for each church.

All the bishops are members of the 'national' Assembly of Catholic Ordinaries in Syria and of the (vast) regional Episcopal Conference for Arab countries. The Eastern Catholic bishops also belong to the (international) synod of their patriarchate or other specific church.

Caritas Syria is the charity organisation of the Catholic Church of Syria.

== Dioceses and archdioceses ==
Eastern Catholic particular Churches

Byzantine Rite

- Melkite Greek Catholic Patriarchate of Antioch (in Damascus)
- Metropolitan Melkite Greek Catholic Archeparchy of Aleppo
- Metropolitan Melkite Greek Catholic Archeparchy of Bosra and Hauran
- Metropolitan Melkite Greek Catholic Archeparchy of Damascus
- Metropolitan Melkite Greek Catholic Archeparchy of Homs
- Melkite Greek Catholic Archeparchy of Latakia

Antiochian Rites

Maronites (no Metropolitan)

- Maronite Catholic Archeparchy of Aleppo
- Maronite Catholic Archeparchy of Damascus
- Maronite Catholic Eparchy of Latakia (Lattaquié)

Syriac (Syrian) Catholic

- Metropolitan Syrian Catholic Archeparchy of Damascus
- Metropolitan Syrian Catholic Archdiocese of Homs
- Syrian Catholic Archeparchy of Aleppo
- Syriac Catholic Archeparchy of Hassaké-Nisibi

Armenian Rite (no Metropolitan)

- Armenian Catholic Archeparchy of Aleppo
- Armenian Catholic Eparchy of Kamichlié
- Armenian Catholic Patriarchal Exarchate of Damascus

Syro-Oriental Rite (no Archeparchy)

- Chaldean Catholic Eparchy of Aleppo

Latin Church

- Apostolic Vicariate of Aleppo (exempt Roman Catholic missionary jurisdiction)

== Cathedrals ==
- Cathedral of Our Lady of Dormition (Greek-Melkite Catholic Archdiocese of Bosra–Haūrān)
- Cathedral of Our Lady of Latakia (Maronite Catholic Diocese of Lattaquié)
- Cathedral of Our Lady of the Annunciation (Greek-Melkite Catholic Archdiocese of Lattaquié)
- Cathedral of Our Lady of the Assumption (Syrian Catholic Archdiocese of Aleppe)
- Cathedral of St. Francis of Assisi (Roman Catholic Apostolic Vicariate of Aleppe)
- Cathedral of the Holy Spirit (Syrian Catholic Archdiocese of Homs)
- Cathedral Our Lady of Reliefs (Armenian Catholic Archdiocese of Aleppe)
- Church of the Queen of the Universe (Armenian Catholic Patriarchal Exarchate of Damas)
- Greek-Melkite Cathedral of Our Lady of Peace (Greek-Melkite Catholic Archdiocese of Homs)
- Greek-Melkite Cathedral of the Virgin Mary (Greek-Melkite Catholic Archdiocese of Aleppe)
- Greek-Melkite Patriarchal Cathedral of the Dormition of Our Lady (Greek-Melkite Catholic Patriarchal See of Antioch)
- Maronite Cathedral (Maronite Catholic Archdiocese of Damas)
- St. Elias Maronite Cathedral (Maronite Catholic Archdiocese of Aleppe)
- St. Joseph’s Cathedral (Chaldean Catholic Diocese of Aleppe)
- Syrian Cathedral (Syrian Catholic Archdiocese of Damas

== Syrian popes ==
Seven popes from Syria ascended the papal throne, many of them lived in Italy. Pope Gregory III, was previously the last pope to have been born outside Europe until the election of Francis in 2013.

Numerical order	Pontificate	Portrait	Name English · Regnal	Personal name	Place of birth	Notes
1	33 – 64/67		St Peter; PETRUS	Simon Peter	Bethsaida, Galilea, Roman Empire	Saint Peter was from village of Bethsaida, Gaulanitis, Roman Syria, Roman Empire (located in the modern Golan Heights)
11	155 to 166		St Anicetus; ANICETUS	Anicitus	Emesa, Syria	Traditionally martyred; feast day 17 April
82	12 July 685 – 2 August 686 (1 year+)		John V Papa IOANNES Quintus		Antioch, Syria	
84	15 December 687 – 8 September 701 (3 year+)		St Sergius I Papa Sergius		Sicily, Italy	Sergius I was born in Sicily, but he was from Syrian parentage
87	15 January 708 to 4 February 708 (21 days)		Sisinnius; Papa SISINNIUS		Syria	
88	25 March 708 – 9 April 715 (7 years+)		Constantine; Papa COSTANTINUS sive CONSTANTINUS		Syria	Last pope to visit Greece while in office, until John Paul II in 2001
90	18 March 731 to 28 November 741 (10 years+)		St Gregory III; Papa GREGORIUS Tertius		Syria	Son of a Syrian named John.

== See also ==
- Christianity in Syria
- Eastern Catholic Churches
- Dioceses of the Syriac Catholic Church
- List of popes
- List of saints from Asia
