= André Bedoglouyan =

André Bedoglouyan, I.C.P.B.
- Titular Bishop of Comana Armeniae Emeritus
- Church: Roman Catholic Church
- See: Titular See of Comana Armeniae
- In office: 1971–2010
- Predecessor: Mesrob Terzian
- Successor: None

Orders
- Ordination: 25 December 1945

Personal details
- Born: 18 February 1920 Zahlé, Lebanon
- Died: 13 April 2010 (aged 90)

André Bedoglouyan (18 February 1920 – 13 April 2010) was a Lebanese-Armenian hierarch of the Armenian Catholic Church.

Bedoglouyan was born in Zahlé, Lebanon and was ordained a priest on 25 December 1945 from the religious order Institut du Clergé Patriarcal de Bzommar. He was appointed Auxiliary Bishop of Patriarch Catholicos of Cilicia on 24 July 1971, as well as titular bishop of Comana Armeniae, and was ordained a bishop on 19 September 1971. Bedoglouyan retired as auxiliary bishop on 5 November 1994. Bedoglouyan died on 13 April 2010.

== See also ==
- Holy See of Cilicia
