= Armenian Catholic Archeparchy of Aleppo =

Eastern Catholic archeparchy in Syria

Coordinates: 36.2075°N 37.1550°E

Archeparchy of Aleppo Aleppensis Armenorum Բերիո թեմ
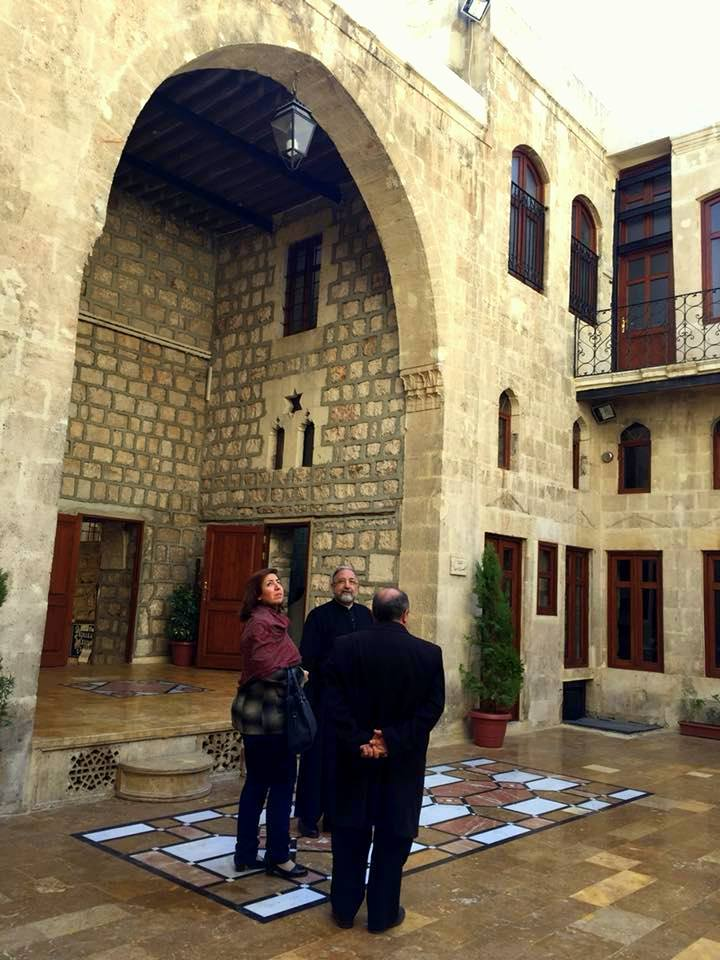
- Cathedral of Our Mother of Reliefs

Location
- Country: Syria
- Headquarters: Aleppo, Aleppo Governorate, Syria

Statistics
- Population: (as of 2022); 5000
- Parishes: 4

Information
- Denomination: Armenian Catholic Church
- Sui iuris church: Armenian Catholic Church
- Rite: Armenian Rite
- Established: 1710; 316 years ago
- Cathedral: Cathedral of Our Mother of Reliefs
- Secular priests: 7 (5 Diocesan, 2 Religious Orders)

Current leadership
- Pope: Leo XIV
- Patriarch: Raphaël Bedros XXI Minassian, I.C.P.B.
- Archeparch: Boutros Marayati

The Armenian Catholic Archeparchy of Aleppo (or Halab or Beroea) (informally Aleppo of the Armenians) is a non-Metropolitan Archeparchy (Eastern Catholic Archdiocese) of the Armenian Catholic Church sui iuris (Armenian Rite in Armenian language) in part of Syria.

It is directly dependent on the Armenian Catholic Patriarch of Cilicia, without being part of his or any other ecclesiastical province.

Its cathedral archiepiscopal see is the Marian Notre-Dame des Dons Armenian Catholic Cathedral, in Halab (Aleppo), Syria.

== History ==
- Established in 1710 as Eparchy of Aleppo (Diocese of Halab / Beroea)
- Promoted on 3 February 1899.03 as Archeparchy of Aleppo (Archdiocese).

== Episcopal ordinaries ==
(incomplete : first centuries unavailable; all Armenian Rite)

Eparchs (Bishops) of Aleppo

- Abraham Petros I Ardzivian (1710 – ?)
- Jacob Petros II Hovsepian (8 May 1740 – 14 October 1749), elected Patriarch of Cilicia
- Michael Petros III Kasparian (1753 – 9 June 1753), elected Patriarch of Cilicia
- Kapriel Ghadroul-Avkadian (1780 – 17 November 1811)
- Kapriel Khoudeyd (3 February 1813 – 10 January 1823)
- Abraham Kupelian (1823 – 15 July 1832)
- Parsegh Ayvazian (January 1838 – 12 January 1860)
- Giuseppe Matear (1852 – ?)
- Grégoire Balitian (2 February 1861 – 26 December 1897)

Archeparchs (Archbishops) of Aleppo

- Avedis Marcus Turkian (6 February 1899 – 20 August 1900)
- Augustin Sayeghian (21 March 1902 – 1 October 1926)
- Kevork Kortikian (31 January 1928 – 1 August 1933)
- Gregory Hindié (10 August 1933 – 10 May 1952), resigned
- Ignatius Bedros XVI Batanian (6 December 1952 – 25 April 1959), appointed Titular Archeparch of Colonia in Armenia
- Georges Layek (26 August 1959 – 15 April 1983)
- Joseph Basmadjan, I.C.P.B. (4 July 1984 – 11 December 1988)
- Boutros Marayati (21 August 1989 – Present)

== See also ==
- Catholic Church in Syria
