= Armenian Catholic Church =

Eastern Catholic church

Coordinates: 33.9844°N 35.6842°E

- Armenian: Հայ Կաթողիկէ Եկեղեցի
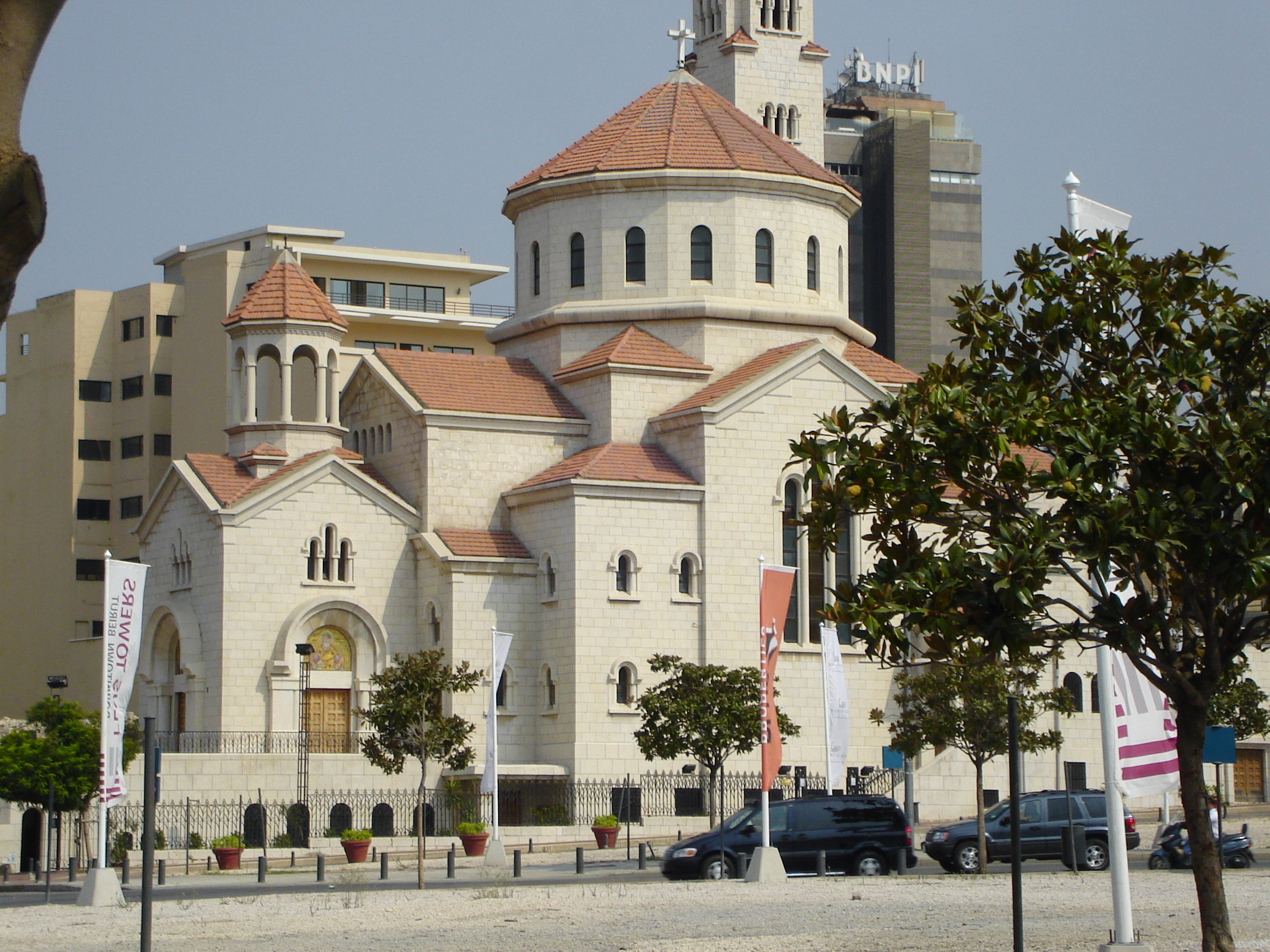
- Cathedral of Saint Elias and Saint Gregory the Illuminator in Beirut, the seat of the Armenian Catholic Patriarchate of Cilicia.
- Classification: Eastern Catholic
- Theology: Catholic theology
- Polity: Episcopal
- Pope: Leo XIV
- Patriarch: Raphaël Bedros XXI Minassian
- Region: Armenian diaspora
- Language: Armenian
- Liturgy: Armenian Rite
- Headquarters: Cathedral of St Elias and St Gregory the Illuminator, Beirut, Lebanon
- Founder: Abraham Petros I Ardzivian
- Origin: 1742; Ottoman Empire (modern Turkey)
- Separated from: Armenian Apostolic Church
- Members: 757,726 (2017 Annuario Pontificio)
- Official website: www.armeniancatholic.org

The Armenian Catholic Church (Note: Armenian: Հայ Կաթողիկէ Եկեղեցի, romanized: Hay Kat’ołikē Ekełec’i; Latin: Ecclesia armeno-catholica) is an Eastern Catholic particular church sui iuris of the Catholic Church. It accepts the leadership of the bishop of Rome, and is therefore in full communion with the universal Catholic Church, including the Latin Church and the 22 other Eastern Catholic Churches. The Armenian Catholic Church is regulated by Eastern canon law, summed up in the Code of Canons of the Eastern Churches.

The head of the sui iuris Armenian Catholic Church is the Armenian Catholic patriarch of Cilicia, whose main cathedral and de facto archiepiscopal see is the Cathedral of Saint Elias and Saint Gregory the Illuminator, in Beirut, Lebanon.

Armenian Caritas is the official aid organization of the Catholic Church in Armenia.

== History ==
The Armenian Church took issue with the 451 Council of Chalcedon and formally broke off communion with the Chalcedonian churches at the 3rd Synod of Dvin in 610. Some Armenian bishops and congregations made attempts to restore communion with the Chalcedonian churches after the 6th ecumenical council in 681. During the Crusades in 1198, the church of the Armenian kingdom of Cilicia entered into union with the Catholic Church, an attempt that did not last. The union was later re-established during the Council of Florence in 1439, but did not have any real effects for centuries.

Some Armenians converted to Catholicism, and in the absence of any specific Armenian Catholic Church in effect became Latins. In medieval China, local Armenians were converted to Catholicism by John of Montecorvino in Beijing and there was also an Armenian Franciscan Catholic community in Quanzhou.

In 1740, Abraham-Pierre I Ardzivian, who had earlier become a Catholic, was elected as the patriarch of Sis. Two years later, Pope Benedict XIV formally established the Armenian Catholic Church. In 1749, the Armenian Catholic Church built a convent in Bzoummar, Lebanon. During the Armenian genocide in 1915–1918, the church was scattered in neighboring countries, mainly in Lebanon and Syria.

An Armenian Catholic community was also previously formed by Armenians living in Poland in the 1630s. The Armenian bishop of Leopolis (see Armenian Catholic Archeparchy of Lviv), Nicholas (Polish: Mikołaj) Torosowicz had entered into union with the Catholic Church. The community which had been historically centered in Galicia as well as in the pre-1939 Polish borderlands in the east, was expelled after World War II to present-day Poland and now has three parishes: in Gdańsk, in Gliwice and in Warsaw.

There is also a history of conversion of Armenians in Transylvania, which went hand in hand with their acculturation under Hungarian influence and policies (see Gherla and Dumbrăveni). Their descendants are part of the Armenian community of modern-day Romania and are tended to by the Ordinariate for Armenian Catholics of Romania.

== Liturgy and practices ==
The Armenian Rite liturgy, as celebrated in the Armenian language, developed prior to the post-Chalcedonian interruption of communion and hence is historically common to all Armenian Christians. It is patterned after the directives of Saint Gregory the Illuminator, founder and patron saint of the Armenian Church. It is used by both the Armenian Apostolic Church, by the Armenian Catholic Church, and by a significant number of Eastern Catholic Christians in the Republic of Georgia. Unlike the Byzantine Church, church buildings of the Armenian rite usually have only a few icons, but like some other Eastern churches have a barrier concealing the priest and the altar from the people during parts of the liturgy. The use of bishop's mitre is reminiscent of the influence Western missionaries once had upon both the miaphysite Orthodox Armenians as well as upon the Armenian Rite Catholics.

== Armenian Catholic communities ==
Apart from Armenia, Georgia and Russia, the Armenian Catholic Church is found widely in the Armenian diaspora, notably in Lebanon (where the Armenian Catholic Church is headquartered), Syria, Egypt, Turkey, Iran, France, U.S.A., Canada, Argentina, Uruguay and Australia.

=== Armenia, Georgia and Eastern Europe ===
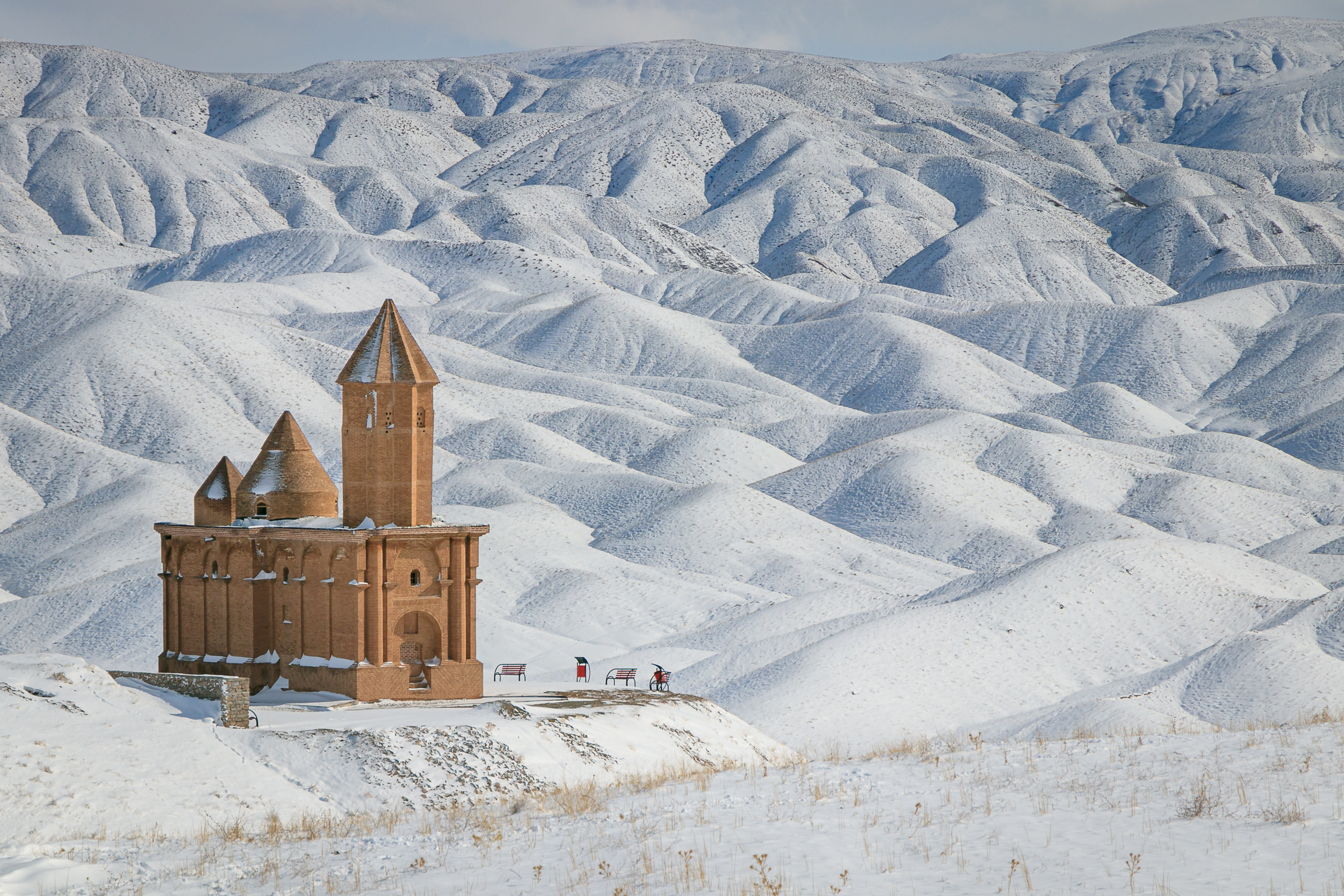
Saint John Church of Sohrol in Iran, built in the 5th or 6th century

Armenian Catholics originated in what is today Armenia, Georgia and Eastern Europe. Beginning in the late 1920s, persecution caused many Armenian Catholics to emigrate. In 1991, after the fall of the Soviet Union, the Bishop of Rome, Pope John Paul II merged the communities in Georgia and Russia with those in Armenia, creating the new Ordinariate for Catholics of Armenian Rite in Eastern Europe, with its residence in Gyumri. The city was not chosen by chance: most Catholic Armenians live in the northern parts of Armenia. This has become a kind of basis for fence-mending with the coreligionists on the other side of the border.

In 1992, Vasken I, Catholicos of the Armenian Apostolic Church, announced that "The presence of the Armenian Catholic Church in Armenia is unacceptable and to be refuted", a decision made as a result of a Holy Synod held on 26 September 1992.

Today Catholic Armenians of Samtskhe-Javakheti live together in Akhaltsikhe and in the nearby villages, as well as in the regions of Akhalkalaki and Ninotsminda. The communities in the last two regions, which are mainly rural, are found in rather distant areas, but the most important link is the historical memory of Catholicism.

A small seminary was established in Gyumri, Armenia, in 1994; there candidates for the priesthood engage in basic studies before moving to the Pontifical College of the Armenians (established 1885) in Rome, where they pursue philosophy and theology.

There are also tens of thousands of Armenian Catholics in Russia, due to the extensive migration from Armenia to Russia that occurred during the collapse of the Soviet Union.

=== United States and Canada ===
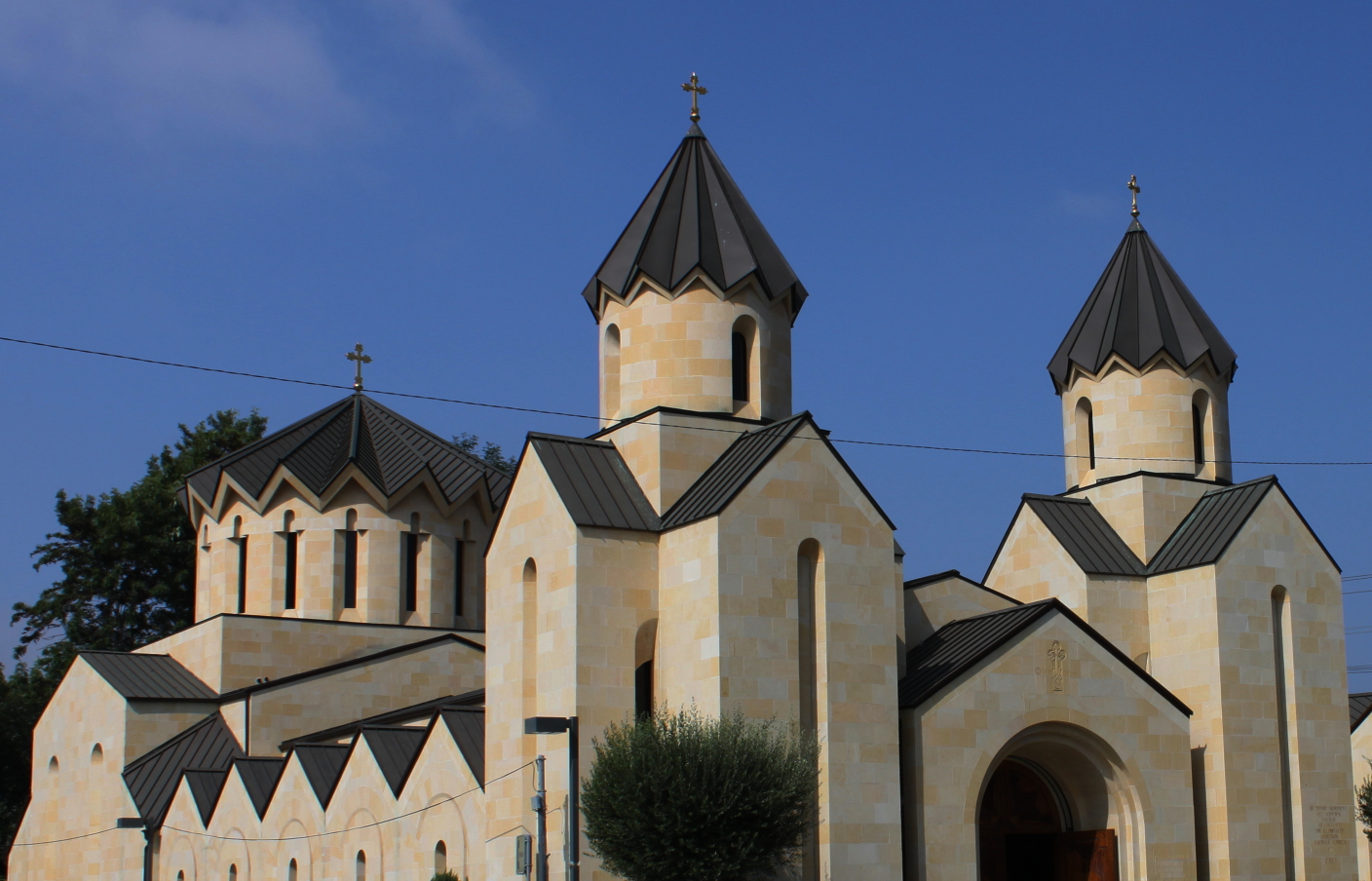
Saint Gregory the Illuminator Armenian Catholic Cathedral in Glendale, California

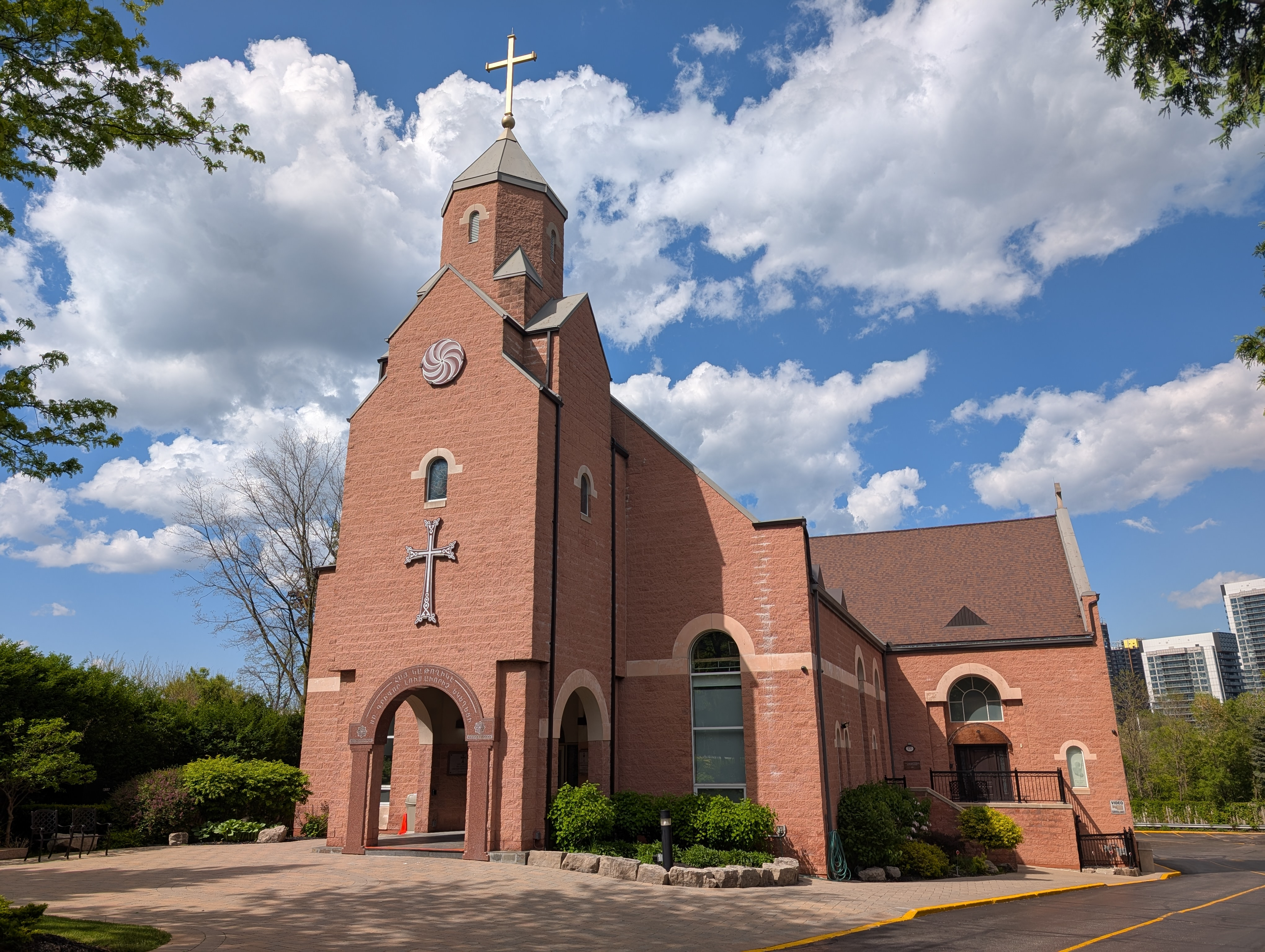
St. Gregory Armenian Catholic Church, Toronto

Currently around 1.5 million Armenians live in North America, of which 35,000 belong to the Armenian Catholic Church.

In the 19th century Catholic Armenians from Western Armenia, mainly from the towns and cities of Karin (Erzurum), and from Constantinople and Mardin, traveled to the United States seeking employment. By the end of that century, many survivors of the Hamidian Massacres had concentrated in several U.S. cities, chiefly in New York. Catholic Armenian communities were also founded in New Jersey, in Boston and Detroit, as in Los Angeles and other cities of California.

Catholic Armenian educational organizations were also founded in many cities. In Philadelphia and Boston, schools were founded by Armenian sisters. Later, a school was founded in La Crescenta, but later moved to the Los Angeles neighborhood of Sunland, eventually being decommissioned.

Many Armenians came to the United States and Canada from the Middle Eastern countries of Lebanon and Syria in the 1970s and in later years. Moreover, many Armenians migrated from Argentina, because of the economic crisis there. At the same time, many Catholic Armenians moved within the United States to San Francisco, San Diego, Chicago, Washington D.C., Atlanta, Miami and Indianapolis.

In 2005, by Pope Benedict XVI's decision, the Catholic Exarchate of the USA and Canada was raised to the status of a diocese. It serviced 35,000 Catholic Armenians in the United States and some 10,000 in Canada. Manuel Batakian became the bishop, or eparch, of the diocese, which has jurisdiction over Canadian and American Catholics who are members of the Armenian Catholic Church. According to a news release by the United States Conference of Catholic Bishops published on Monday, May 23, 2011, Pope Benedict XVI, named Archpriest Mikaël Antoine Mouradian, superior of the Convent of Notre Dame in Bzommar, Lebanon, as the new bishop of the Eparchy of Our Lady of Nareg in New York for Armenian Catholics. The appointment of Lebanon-born Bishop Mouradian was publicized in Washington on May 21 by Archbishop Pietro Sambi, Apostolic Nuncio to the United States.

=== France ===
Next to North America, France holds the largest number of Armenian Catholics outside the Middle East and Eastern Europe. The Eparchy of Sainte-Croix-de-Paris was established in 1960 with Bishop Garabed Armadouni as exarch. Since 1977, the eparchy has been led by Bishop Krikor Gabroyan.

There are some 30,000 Armenian Catholics in the eparchy, the headquarters of which are in Paris. Apart from the Cathedral of the Holy Cross in Paris, the eparchy has six churches in Arnouville-lès-Gonesse, Lyon, Marseille, Saint-Chamond, Sèvres and Valence. A community of Mekhitarist Fathers resides in Sèvres and a convent of Armenian Sisters of the Immaculate Conception runs a school in Marseille.

=== Brazil ===
The Catholic Armenian Community of São Paulo was founded in 1935, as the Chaplaincy of the Catholic Armenian Mission, responding to requests from Armenian immigrants who had settled in Brazil since 1923, mostly from Marach, now in modern day Turkey. The church is between the metro stations Armênia and Tiradentes, at Tiradentes Avenue #718.

== Demographics ==
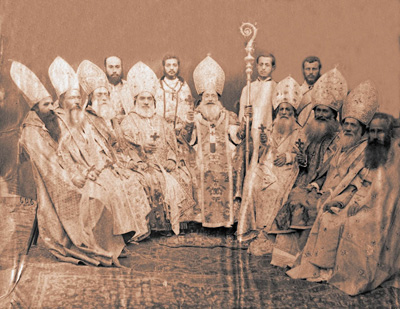
Bishops meeting in Jerusalem, circa 1880. The archbishop (centre) wears a Roman pallium.

Estimates from the 19th century varied between 40,000 to 150,000 Armenian Catholics worldwide, with 136,400 in 1911.

Independent sources estimate the number of Catholic Armenians in the early 21st century at 150,000, with sizable communities in Lebanon, Iraq, Iran, Turkey, Jerusalem, France and the United States.

== Structure ==
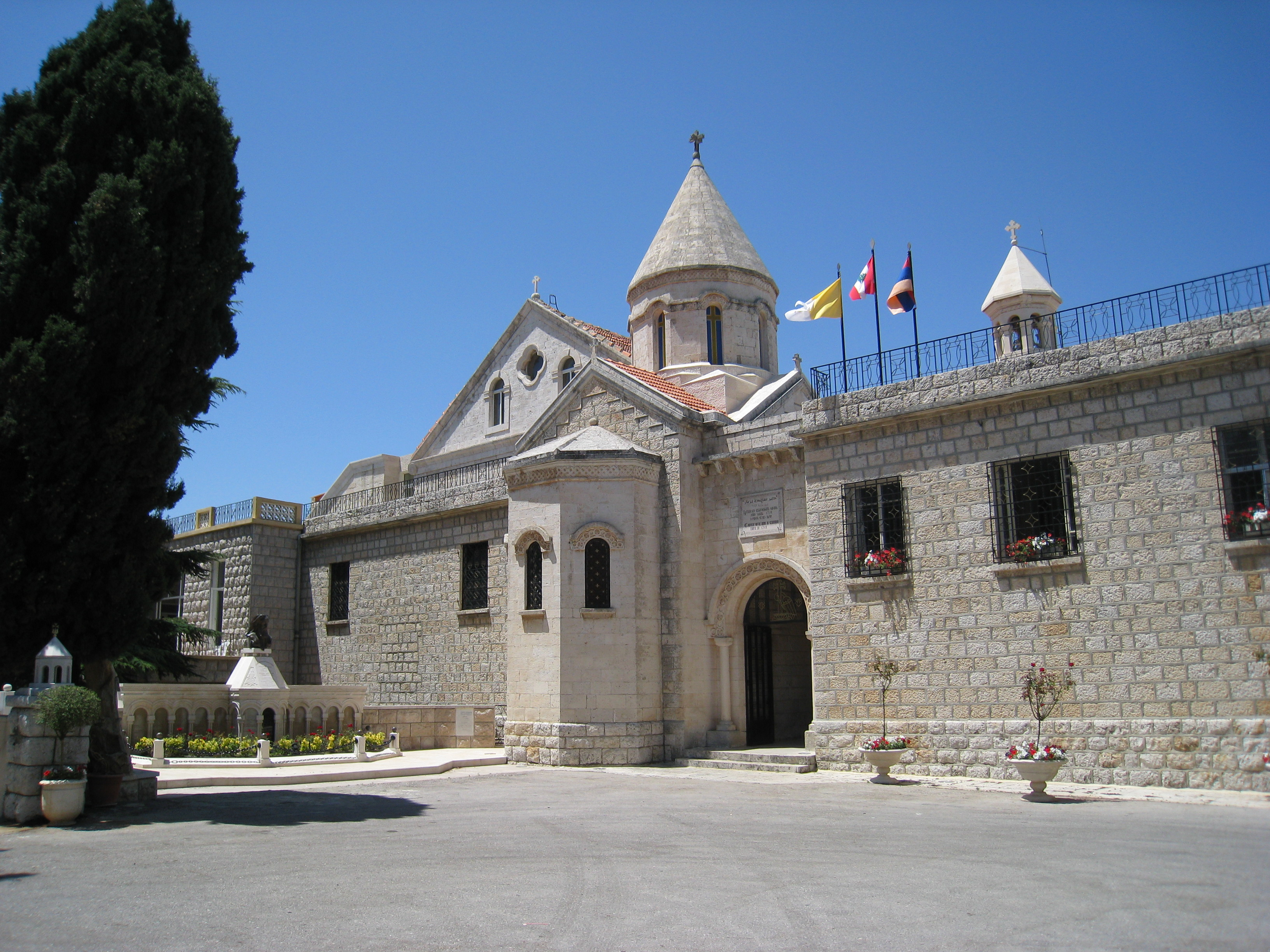
Headquarters of the Armenian Catholic Patriarchate in Bzoummar, Lebanon

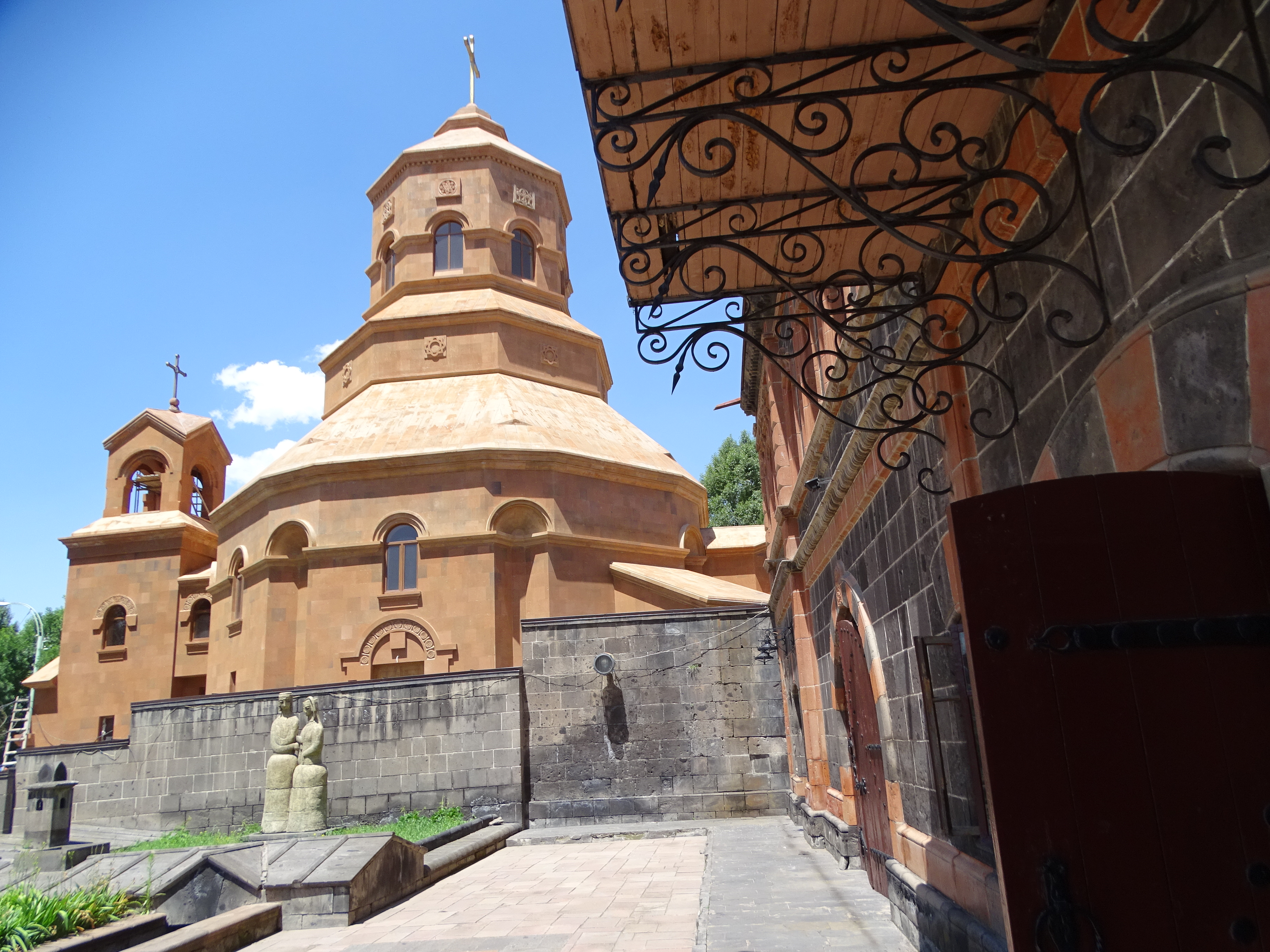
Cathedral of the Holy Martyrs in Gyumri, Armenia

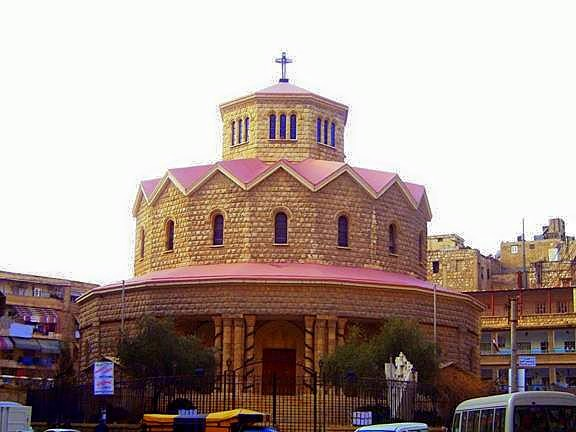
Armenian Catholic church of the Holy Trinity in Aleppo, Syria

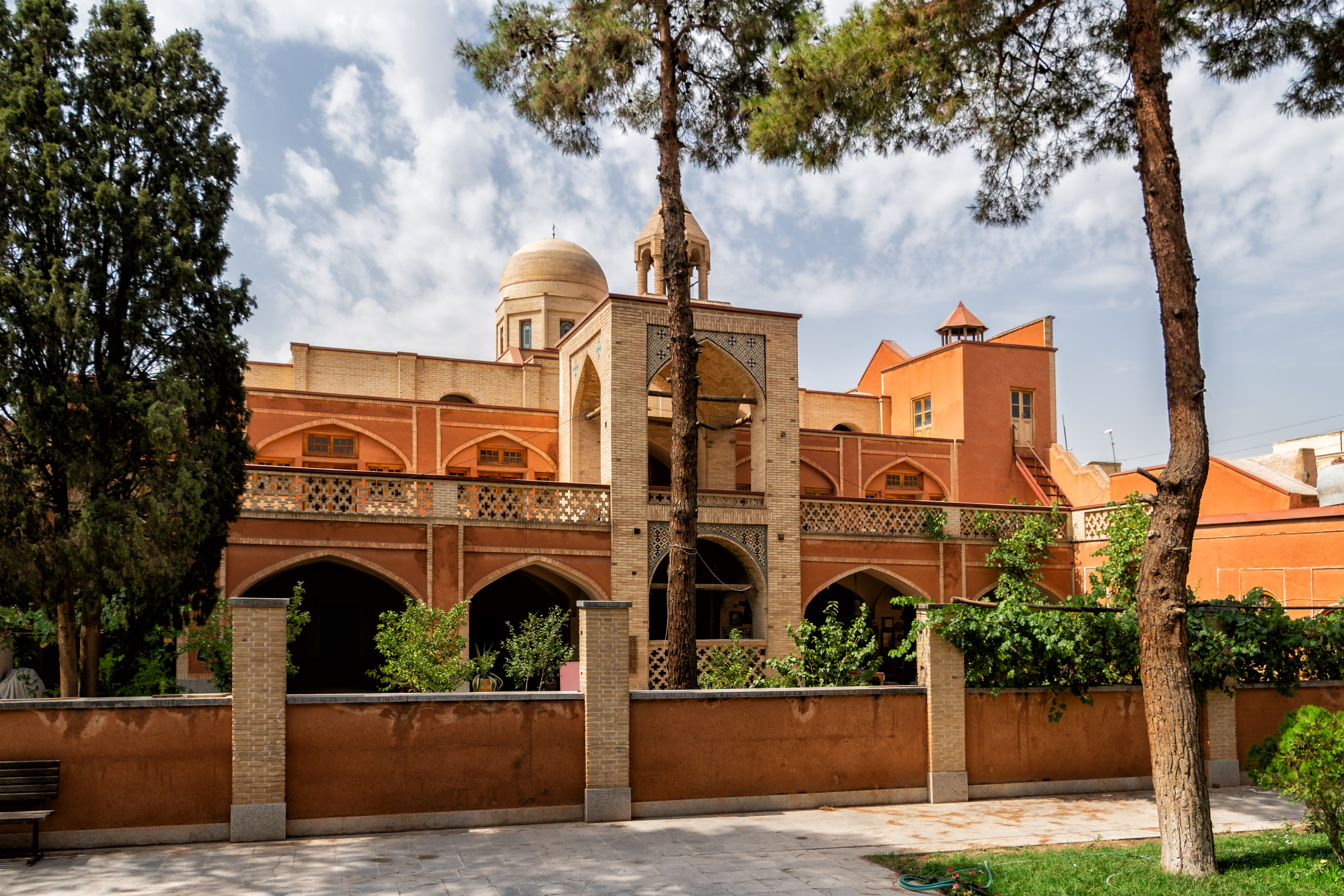
Church of Our Lady of the Rosary in Isfahan, Iran

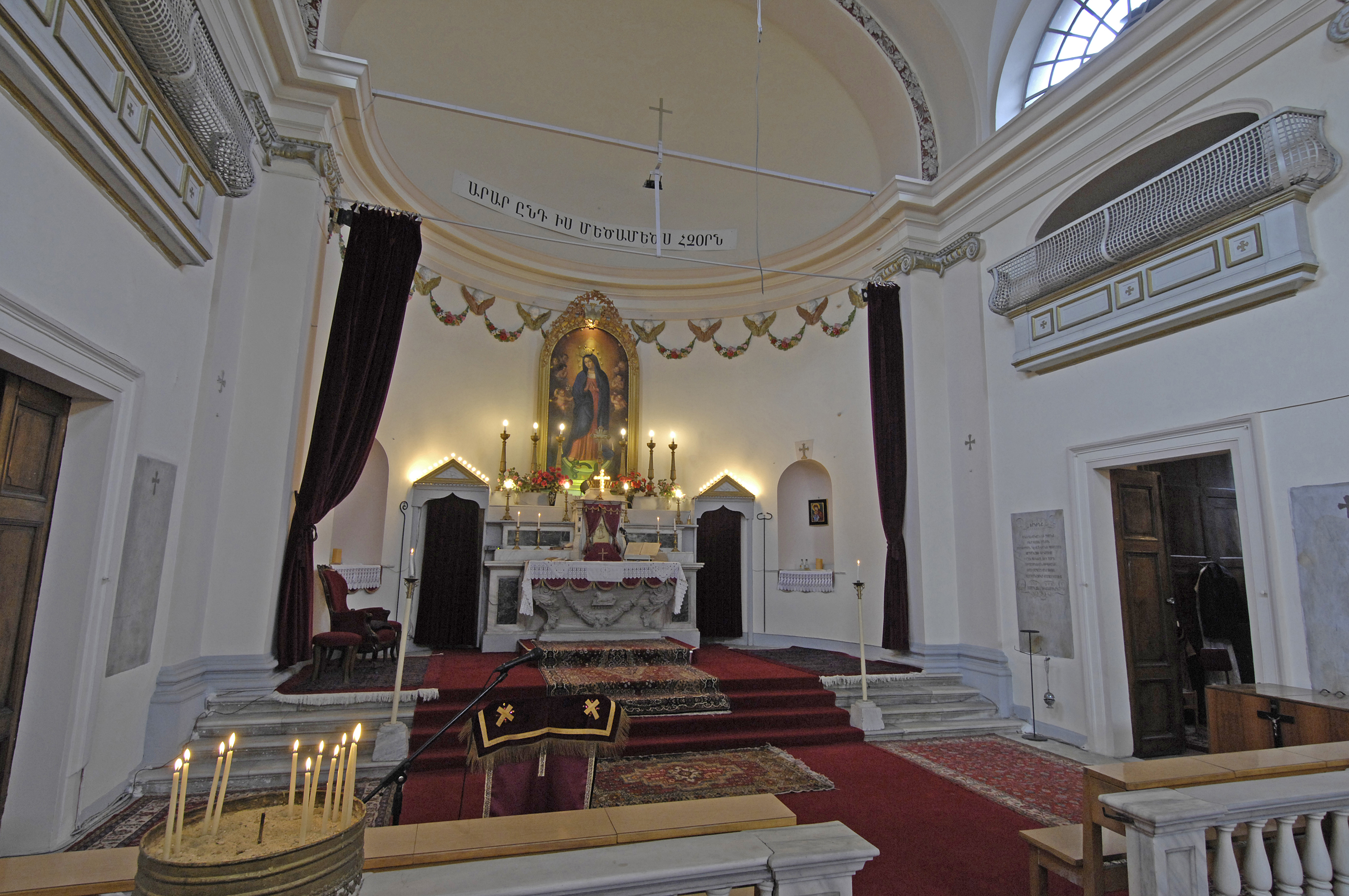
Anarat Hurtin Church in Istanbul, Turkey

The Armenian Catholic Church is divided into archdioceses, eparchies, apostolic exarchates, ordinariates for the Faithful of the Eastern Rite and patriarchal exarchates, each of which has functions similar to a diocese.

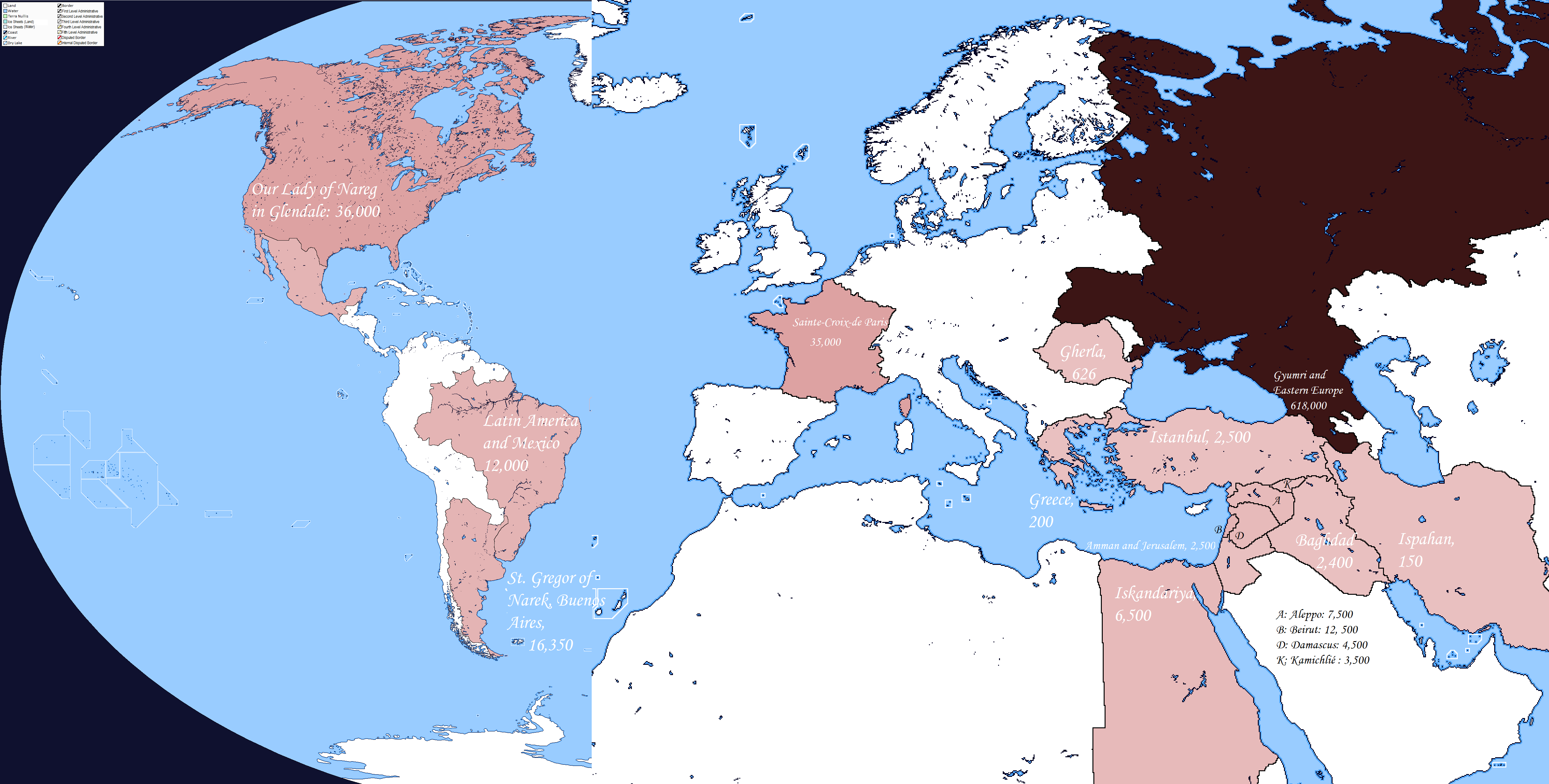
A map of Armenian Catholic jurisdictions

=== Current structure ===
The Armenian Catholic Patriarchate of the See of Cilicia is the supreme authority of the Armenian Catholic Church. On 23 September 2021, Raphaël Bedros XXI Minassian was elected as the church's new patriarch.

Below is a list of the jurisdictions with their number of adherents.

Archeparchies (Archdioceses)	1990	2000	2017
Patriarchate of Cilicia, also sole Metropolitanate as Armenian Catholic Archeparchy of Beirut, Lebanon (Patriarchal proper archdiocese)	15,000	12,000	12,500
Archeparchy of Aleppo (Halab, Beroa), Syria	15,000	17,000	7,000
Archeparchy of Baghdad, Iraq	2,200	2,000	2,400
Archeparchy of Istanbul (Constantinople), Turkey	3,700	3,680	2,500
Archeparchy of Lviv, Ukraine	N/A	N/A	0
Suffragan Eparchies in the Patriarch's Province of Cilicia			
Ispahan, Iran	2,200	2,200	150
Alexandria, actually in Cairo, Egypt	1,500	1,287	6,500
Qamishli, Syria	4,303	4,000	3,500
Other Eparchies in the diaspora			
Eparchy of Our Lady of Nareg in the United States of America and Canada	34,000	36,000	36,000
Eparchy of Sainte-Croix-de-Paris, France	30,000	30,000	35,000
Eparchy of Saint Gregory of Narek, Buenos Aires	established in 1989	16,000	16,350
Apostolic Exarchates (missionary, directly dependent on the Holy See)			
Armenian Catholic Apostolic Exarchate of Latin America and Mexico	30,000	12,000	12,000
Ordinariates for the Faithful of the Eastern Rites			
Greece (Athens)	650	600	200
Romania (Gherla)	N/A	1,000	626
Eastern Europe (Gyumri, Armenia; covering post-Soviet states)	established in 1991	220,000	618,000
Poland (Warsaw, Poland)			670 (as of 2013)
Patriarchal Exarchates			
Damascus, part of Syria	9,000	8,000	4,500
Jerusalem and Amman (Jordan & Holy Land)	N/A	280	500
Total	142,853~	362,047~	757,726~

==== Titular metropolitan archeparchies ====
Achrida (Ohrid), Pessinus, Traianopolis in Rhodope

==== Titular non-metropolitan archeparchies ====
Chalcedon, Colonia in Armenia, Mardin, Nisibis of the Armenians, Sebaste, Tarsus

==== Titular eparchies ====
Adana, Amida, Anazarbus, Ancyra, Artvin, Cesarea in Cappadocia, Garin, Kharput, Marasc, Melitene, Mush, Prusa, Tokat, Trapezus

=== Current hierarchy of the Armenian Catholic Church ===
The present Armenian Catholic episcopate (16 hierarchs as per 7 September 2026) is as follows:

Patriarch and Primate:

- Raphaël Bedros XXI Minassian, ICPB, Patriarch of Cilicia (since 2021)

Eparchial Archbishops and Bishops:

- Boutros Marayati, Archbishop of Aleppo (since 1989)
- Nersès Zabarian, Archbishop of Baghdad (since 2023)
- Kevork Noradounguian, ICPB, Archbishop-Bishop of the Ordinariate for Eastern Europe (since 2024)
- Kricor-Okosdinos Coussa, Bishop of Iskanderiya (since 2004)
- Mikaël Antoine Mouradian, ICPB, Bishop of Our Lady of Nareg in Glendale (USA) (since 2011)
- Elie Yéghiayan, ICPB, Bishop of Sainte-Croix-de-Paris (since 2018)
- Antranig Ayvazian, Bishop of Kameshli (since 2022)
- Kévork Assadourian, ICPB, Bishop, Exarch of Damascus (since 2023)

Auxiliary Bishops:

- Parsegh Baghdassarian, ICPB, Auxiliary Bishop of Our Lady of Nareg in Glendale (USA) (since 2024)
- Krikor Badichah, ICPB, Auxiliary Bishop of Beirut (since 2024)

Emeritus Hierarchs:

- Boghos Lévon Zékiyan, Archbishop Emeritus of Istanbul (since 2024)
- Kévork Khazoumian, ICPB, Archbishop Coadjutor Emeritus of Istanbul (since 2014)
- Vartan Waldir Boghossian, SDB, Bishop Emeritus of Saint Gregory of Narek in Buenos Aires (since 2018)
- Jean Teyrouz, ICPB, Bishop Emeritus of Sainte-Croix-de-Paris (since 2018)
- Sarkis Davidian, ICPB, Bishop Emeritus of Isfahan (since 2026), Apostolic Administrator of Isfahan (since 2026)

== Publications ==
The Armenian Catholic Church produces a number of publications:

- Avedik, the official organ of the church
- Avedaper Verelk, a religious, spiritual and cultural publication of St. Gregory Armenian Catholic Church
- Avedaper, a weekly bulletin of the Armenian Catholic dioceses
- Gantch Hrechdagabedin, official publication of the Our Lady of Bzommar Convent
- Massis, a general monthly publication
- Church bulletins

The Armenian Catholic Church has presses that publish many liturgical, spiritual books, publications, pamphlets and translations from general Catholic publications.

== See also ==
- Armenian Apostolic Church
- Armenian Evangelical Church
- Catholic Church in Armenia
- List of Armenian Catholic Patriarchs of Cilicia
- Mechitarist Monks of the Armenian Catholic Church
- Ignatius Maloyan
- Gregorio Pietro Agagianian
- Religion in Armenia
