= Hovhannes =

Hovhannes (Armenian: Հովհաննես (reformed); Յովհաննէս (classical)), also spelled Hovhanes, Hovannes or Hovanes is an Armenian name equivalent to English John. It is comparable with Ioannes in Greek or Johannes in Latin.

== People with the given name ==
=== Hovannes ===
- Hovannes Adamian (1879–1932), Soviet Armenian engineer
- Hovannes Amreyan (born 1975), Armenian weightlifter
- Hovannes "Ivan" Gevorkian (1907–1989), Armenian surgeon and scientist

=== Hovhannes ===
- Hovhannes Abelian (1865–1936), Armenian actor
- Hovhannes Aivazovsky (1817–1900), Russian Romantic painter
- Hovhannes Avoyan (born 1965), serial entrepreneur, investor, and scholar
- Hovhannes Avtandilyan (born 1978), Armenian diver
- Hovhannes Azoyan (born 1967), Armenian actor and presenter
- Hovhannes Babakhanyan (born 1968), Armenian-American actor and singer
- Hovhannes Bachkov (born 1992), Armenian boxer
- Hovhannes Badalyan (1924–2001), Armenian singer and professor
- Hovhannes Bagramyan (1897–1982), Soviet Armenian military commander and Marshal of the Soviet Union
- Hovhannes Barseghyan (born 1970), Armenian retired weightlifter
- Hovhannes Bujicanian (1873–1915), Ottoman Armenian teacher and academic
- Hovhannes Chekijyan (born 1928), Armenian conductor and art director
- Hovhannes Danielyan (born 1987), Armenian light flyweight amateur boxer
- Hovhannes Davtyan (born 1985), Armenian actor
- Hovhannes Davtyan (born 1983), Armenian judoka
- Hovhannes Demirchyan (born 1975), Armenian football player
- Hovhannes Erznkatsi (c. 1250–1326), Armenian scholar
- Hovhannes Gabuzyan (born 1995), Armenian chess Grandmaster
- Hovhannes Galstyan (born 1969), Armenian film director, writer, and producer
- Hovhannes Ghorghanyan, 19th-century Russian-Armenian economist
- Hovhannes Goharyan (born 1988), Armenian footballer and manager
- Hovhannes Hakhverdyan (1873–1931), first Minister of Defence of the First Republic of Armenia
- Hovhannes Hambardzumyan (born 1990), Armenian football player
- Hovhannes Harutiunian (1860–1915), Ottoman Armenian teacher and writer
- Hovhannes Harutyunyan (born 1999), Armenian footballer
- Hovhannes Hintliyan (1866–1950), Armenian teacher, pedagogue, publisher, and educator
- Hovhannes Hisarian (1827–1916), Ottoman Armenian writer, novelist, archeologist, editor, and educator
- Hovhannes Hovhannisyan (1864–1929), Armenian poet, translator and educator
- Hovhannes Hovhannisyan (born 1980), Armenian politician, theologian, historian and professor
- Hovhannes I of Ani, King of Ani (1020–1040)
- Hovhannes Imastaser (1045/1050–1129), a medieval Armenian multi-disciplinary scholar
- Hovhannes Kasparian (1927–2011), Armenian Catholic Catholicos-Patriarch of Cilicia
- Hovhannes Katchaznouni (1868–1938), the first Prime Minister of the First Republic of Armenia
- Hovhannes Mamikonean, 7th-century Armenian noble
- Hovhannes Masehyan (1864–1931), Iranian Armenian translator and diplomat
- Hovhannes Mrkuz Jughayetsi (1643–1715), Armenian theologian and philosopher
- Hovhannes Nazaryan (born 1998), Armenian footballer
- Hovhannes Sargsyan (born 1987), Armenian cross-country skier
- Hovhannes Semerdjian (1920–2013), French-Armenian painter
- Hovhannes Setian (1853–1930), Armenian short story writer, poet, and teacher
- Hovhannes Shiraz (1915–1984), Armenian poet
- Hovhannes Tahmazyan (born 1970), Armenian footballer
- Hovhannes Tcholakian (1919–2016), Turkish-Armenian Archbishop of the Armenian Catholic Church
- Hovhannes Ter-Mikaelyan, 20th-century Armenian politician
- Hovhannes Tertsakian (1924–2002), bishop of the Catholic Church in the United States
- Hovhannes Tlkurantsi (1450–1535), Armenian poet
- Hovhannes Tumanyan (1869–1923), Armenian poet and writer
- Hovhannes Vahanian (1832–1891), Ottoman politician, minister, social activist, writer, and reformer
- Hovhannes Varderesyan (born 1989), Armenian Greco-Roman wrestler
- Hovhannes XII Arsharuni (1854–1929), Armenian Patriarch of Constantinople
- Hovhannes Zanazanyan (1946–2015), Soviet Armenian football player and coach
- Hovhannes Zardaryan (1918–1992), Armenian painter
- Hovhannes, Catholicos of Armenia or John V the Historian, Catholicos of Armenia from 897 to 925

== Middle name ==
- Haroutioun Hovanes Chakmakjian (1878–1973), Armenian-American scientist
- Senekerim-Hovhannes Artsruni, 11th-century Armenian king
- Varaztad Hovhannes Kazanjian (1879–1974), Armenian surgeon and founder of plastic surgery

== See also ==
- Alan Hovhaness (1911–2000), American composer
- Hovhannisyan (surname)
- St. Hovhannes Church, multiple churches in the Caucasus
- List of Armenian Patriarchs of Jerusalem
- List of Armenian Patriarchs of Constantinople
- List of Armenian Catholicoi of Cilicia
- Adapa#As Oannes (Hovhannes Հովհաննես in Armenian)
- Ohannes
