= Ohannes =

Ohannes is a male given name with Armenian roots. Spelling variants include Hovhannes, Oganes, and Ohan. The surnames Oganezov and Oganessian are derived from it. Notable people with the name include:

== People ==
- Loris Ohannes Chobanian (1933–2023), American composer
- Ohannés Gurekian (1902–1984), Armenian architect
- Ohannes Kurkdjian (1851–1903), Armenian photographer
- Oganez Mkhitaryan (born 1962), Russian football coach and player
- Ohannes Tchekidjian (born 1929), Armenian composer and conductor
- Onno Tunç (1948–1996), Turkish musician
- Oganes Zanazanyan (1946–2015), Armenian football coach and player

== See also ==
- Hovhannes (disambiguation)
- Ohan (disambiguation)
- Ohanian
