= Ohan =

Ohan is a common masculine Armenian name and can be used as a nickname for Hovhannes or Ohannes. The name Ohan is of Armenian origin and serves as a traditional masculine given name. It acts as a shortened form of Hovhannes or Ohannes (the Armenian equivalent of John), which ultimately stems from the Hebrew name Yochanan, meaning "God is gracious."

Ohan may refer to:

== People ==
- Ohan Durian (1922–2011), Armenian conductor
- Mikho-Ohan, pen name of Armenian writer Nar-Dos

== Films ==
- Ohan (film), 1984 Japanese film directed by Kon Ichikawa

== Others ==
- Oak Hill Association of Neighborhoods (abbreviated OHAN), an association in Oak Hill, Austin, Texas

== See also ==
- Ohanian, an Armenian surname
- Ohannes (disambiguation)
- Hovhannes (disambiguation)
