= Hovhannisyan =

Origin
- Meaning: Son of Hovhannes
- Region of origin: Armenia

Other names
- Variant forms: Hovhannisian, Hovhannesian, Hovannesian, Oganessian

Hovhannisyan or Hovannisyan (Armenian: Հովհաննիսյան [hɔvhɑnnisˈjɑn]) is an Armenian surname meaning "son of Hovhannes", the Armenian equivalent of John, thus making it equivalent to Johnson. It is the most common surname in Armenia.

Variants of the name in Armenian and Western Armenian include Hovhannesian, Hovannesian, Hovannisian, Hovhannisian, Ovanesyan, and Oganessian.

Notable people with the surname include:

== Hovhannisyan ==
- Albert Hovhannisyan (2001–2020), junior sergeant of the Armenian Army
- Arman Hovhannisyan (born 1993), Armenian footballer
- Armen Hovhannisyan (1994–2014), Nagorno-Karabakh Republic Defense Army soldier
- Armen Hovhannisyan (footballer) (born 2000), Armenian footballer
- Arpine Hovhannisyan (born 1983), Armenian politician, lawyer and former Minister of Justice
- Art Hovhannisyan (born 1981), Armenian-American boxer
- Artak Hovhannisyan (born 1993), Armenian sport wrestler
- Arthur Hovhannisyan, multiple people
- Artsrun Hovhannisyan (born 1980), press secretary of the Armenian Ministry of Defense
- Ashot Hovhannisyan (1887–1972), Armenian politician
- Azat Hovhannisyan (born 1988), Armenian boxer
- Benik Hovhannisyan (born 1993), Armenian footballer
- Edgar Hovhannisyan (1930–1998), Armenian composer
- Gayane Hovhannisyan (born 1965), Armenian linguist and professor
- Gevorg Hovhannisyan (born 1983), Armenian footballer
- Gurgen Hovhannisyan (born 1998), Armenian boxer
- Harutyun Hovhannisyan (born 1981), Armenian Greco-Roman wrestler
- Hovhannes Hovhannisyan (1864–1929), Armenian poet, translator and educator
- Hovhannes Hovhannisyan (YSU) (born 1980), Armenian rector, theologian, scientist and professor
- Hrach Hovhannisyan (born 1987), Armenian Greco-Roman wrestler
- Kamo Hovhannisyan (born 1992), Armenian footballer
- Khoren Hovhannisyan (born 1955), Armenian football midfielder
- Konstantine Hovhannisyan (1911–1984), Armenian professor, architect and archaeologist
- Lilit Hovhannisyan (born 1987), Armenian singer
- Lusine Hovhannisyan (born 1990), Armenian footballer
- Menua Hovhannisyan (1985–2020), Armenian serviceman and intelligence officer
- Mher Hovhannisyan (born 1978), Armenian-Belgian chess grandmaster
- Michael Hovhannisyan (1867–1933), Armenian writer known by the pseudonym Nar-Dos
- Mkrtich Hovhannisyan (born 1970), Armenian football midfielder
- Nazeni Hovhannisyan (born 1982), Armenian actress, presenter and lecturer
- Nerses Hovhannisyan (1938–2016), Armenian film director, actor and screenwriter
- Rafayel Hovhannisyan (born 2001), Armenian boxer
- Robert Hovhannisyan (born 1991), Armenian chess Grandmaster
- Sargis Hovhannisyan (born 1968), Armenian football defender
- Simon Hovhannisyan (born 1994), Armenian singer-songwriter and dancer
- Tigran Hovhannisyan (born 1974), Armenian football midfielder
- Vahan Hovhannisyan (1956–2014), Armenian politician and minister
- Vardan Hovhannisyan, Armenian director and producer
- Zhirayr Hovhannisyan (born 1981), Armenian sport wrestler
- Zhora Hovhannisyan (born 1987), Armenian footballer

== Hovanessian ==
- Diana Der Hovanessian (1934–2018), Armenian American poet, translator and author
- Vartan Hovanessian (1896–1982), Iranian Armenian architect
- Zabel Hovhannessian (1878–1943), birth name of Ottoman Armenian writer Zabel Yesayan

== Hovannisian/Hovhannisian ==
- Ashot Hovhannisian (1887–1972), Armenian Marxist historian, theorist and Communist official
- Garin Hovannisian (born 1986), Armenian American writer, filmmaker, and producer
- Larisa Hovannisian (born 1988), Armenian-American social entrepreneur and founder of Teach For Armenia
- Raffi Hovannisian (born 1959), American-born Armenian politician, Foreign Minister of Armenia
- Richard Hovannisian (1932–2023), Armenian American historian and professor emeritus
- Sargis Hovhannisian (1879–1919), birth name of Aram Manukian, Armenian revolutionary, statesman, and a leading member of the Armenian Revolutionary Federation (Dashnaktsutyun) party. He is widely regarded as the founder of the First Republic of Armenia

== Ter-Hovhannisian/Ter-Hovhannisyan ==
- Grigor Ter-Hovhannisian (1854–1908), Armenian writer known by the pseudonym Muratsan
- Nikoghayos Ter-Hovhannisyan (1867–1914), Armenian fedayee from Karabakh known by his pseudonym Nikol Duman

== Ter-Ovanesyan ==
- Igor Ter-Ovanesyan (born 1938), Soviet and Ukrainian former long jumper and coach, of Armenian descent
