= Ca' Zenobio degli Armeni =

Palace structure in Venice, Italy

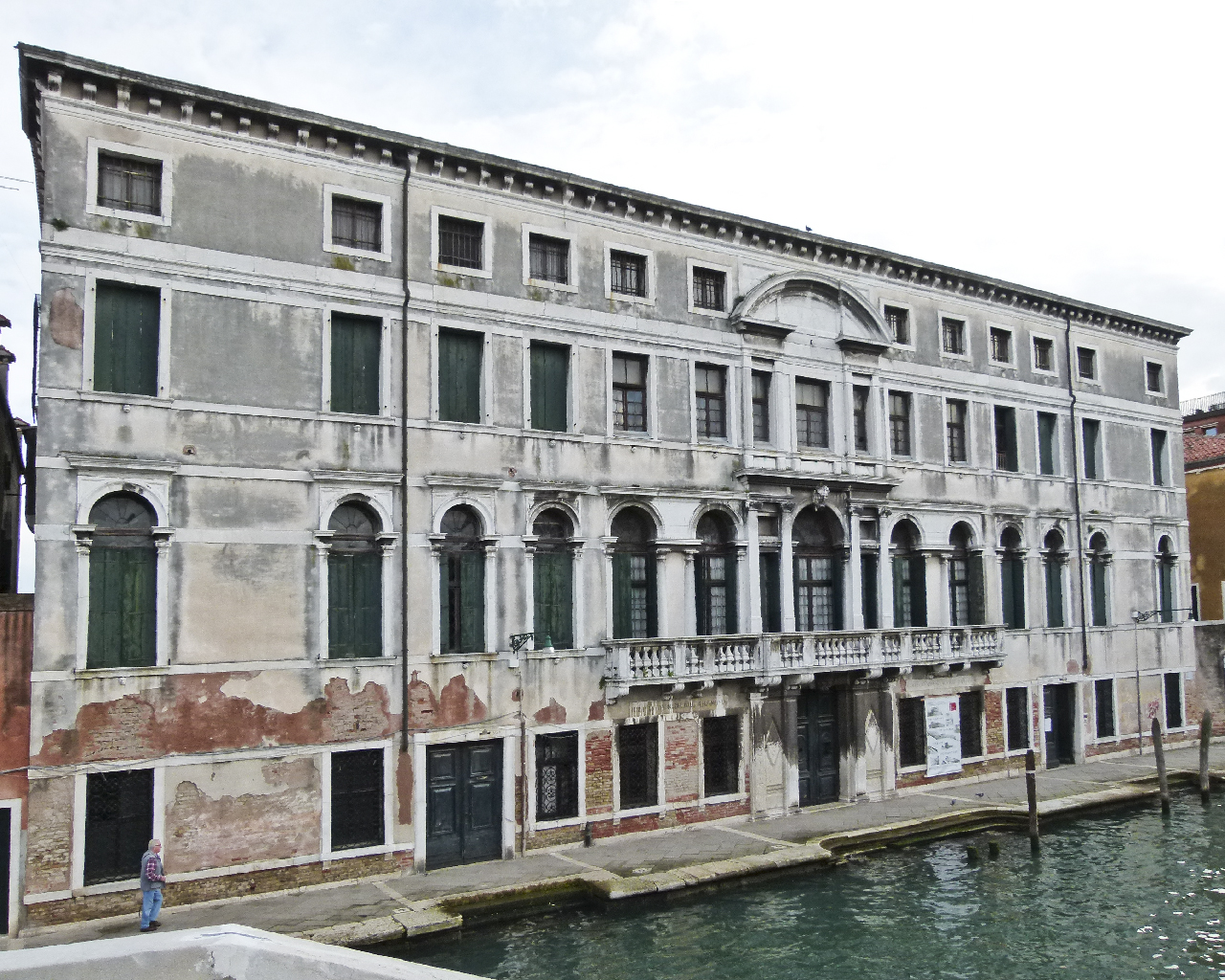
- Ca' Zenobio degli Armeni, façade
- Click on the map for a fullscreen view
- Established: 1690
- Location: Venice, Veneto
- Coordinates: 45°26′01″N 12°19′15″E
- Type: Historic site
- Architect: Antonio Gaspari
- Website: palazzo-zenobio.com

The Ca' Zenobio degli Armeni (Palazzo Zenobio, Ca' Zenobio) is a three-story Baroque-style palace structure in the sestiere of Dorsoduro, in Venice, Italy. The nearby bridge, Ponte del Soccorso, connects it to the Palazzo Ariani.

== History ==
Constructed on the foundations of the 14th-century gothic Palazzo Morosini, belonging to the Morosini family, the property was acquired by Zenobio family on April 14, 1664. Verità Zenobio and her younger brother Pietro, commissioned Antonio Gaspari, a pupil of Baldassare Longhena, to redesign the palace. In 1690, the construction of the new palace was completed. In 1777, neoclassical architect Tommaso Temanza designed the archive and library, located at the southern end of the palace’s gardens. The Zenobio family retained possession of the palace til the mid 19th century.

In 1844, the palace was sold to Count Salvi from Vincenza, who undertook a renovation of the palace. Among the renovations was in 1848-49, landscape architect, Antonio Caregaro Negrin created a new garden in the romantic style, with two hills and a small bridge, which still exists today.

=== Moorat-Raphael College (1851-1997) ===
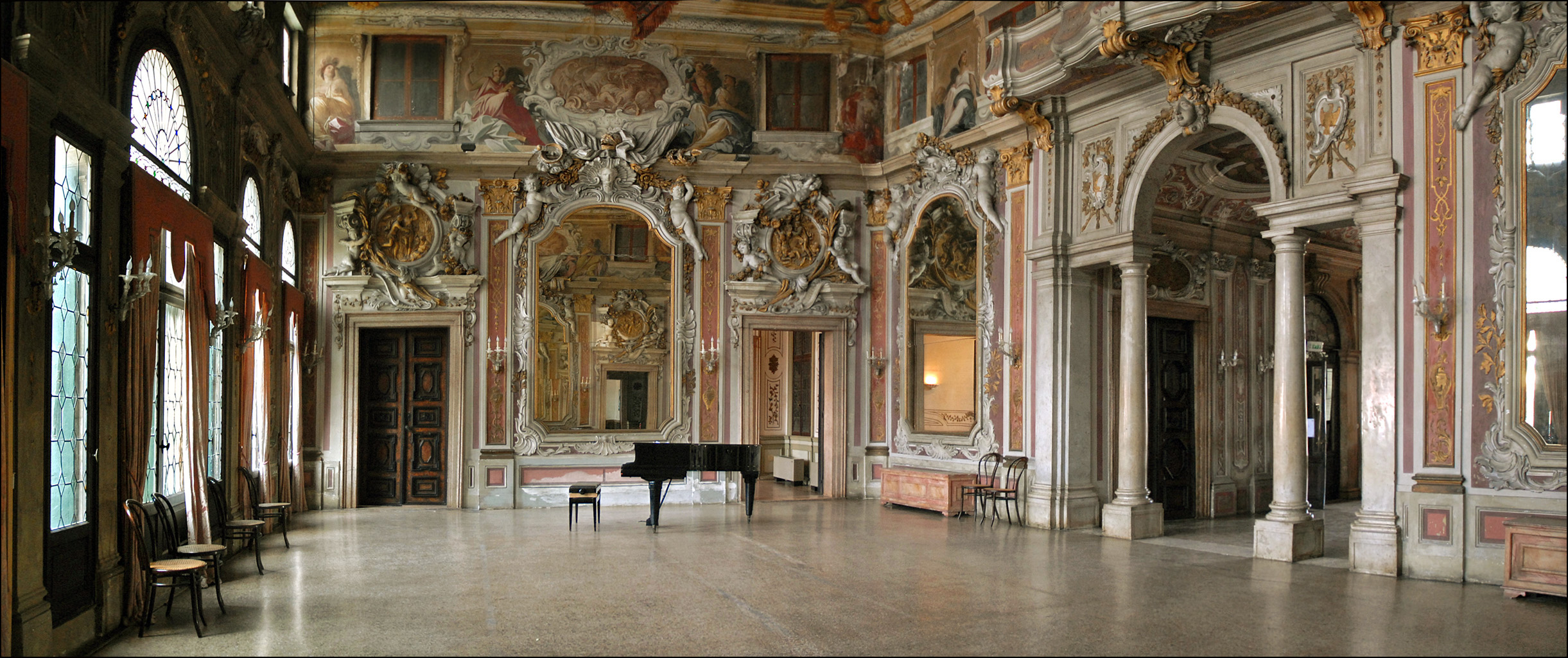
The Hall of Mirrors ballroom (2009)

In 1850 it became the home of the College of the Armenian monks of the Mekhitarist order. The Mekhitarists had already established a monastery on the island of San Lazzaro degli Armeni in 1717, but there was no school for Armenian children, except for those preparing for the priesthood.

Initially, two separate colleges were founded in Padua (in 1834) and Venice (in 1836, in Ca' Pesaro) with the contributions of two wealthy Armenian businessmen from Madras, India, Samuel Mkrtich Moorat and Edward Raphael. These colleges merged in 1871 to form the Moorat-Raphael College (Armenian: Մուրադ-Ռափայելյան վարժարան; Italian: Collegio Armeno Moorat-Raphael). The College served as a boarding school for Armenian students from 1851 to 1997.

The two benefactors established a gold bullion interest-bearing account at a London bank to meet the financial needs of the school. In its early years, the trust fund generated enough interest to sustain the school and provide scholarships for students in need. The palace was renovated for the College's needs, with the addition of classrooms, dormitories, kitchen and refectory.

However, following World War II, the fund's income declined as gold was no longer an interest-earning currency. Consequently, the fund was converted into pounds sterling to generate interest. Limited maintenance was undertaken due to insufficient student fees, relying on benefactors. By 1997, the fund existed but yielded only a few hundred dollars annually. Access to the fund was restricted, and its income negligible. To compensate for this loss of income, the Mekhitarist order in San Lazzaro found other revenue streams, such as renting out the school's halls.

In 1997, the College had 52 students enrolled in four classes of senior high school. Students came from seven different countries and lessons were taught in Italian, Armenian, English and French. The curriculum covered Armenian language, literature, culture and religion, alongside an Italian curriculum. Tuition, room and boarding at the College cost $7,000 per year, although many students attended on scholarships provided by the Mekhitarist order. The school's six year program was consolidated into four years, and new courses were introduced to make the curriculum more appealing. Despite these efforts, the administration decided to close the College since it was no longer sustainable.

The College still exists as an association and remains a non-profit organisation. The palace is often rented for events, wedding receptions, and exhibitions during the Venice Biennale.

==== Notable alumni ====
The Moorat-Raphael College maintained a special prestige among the Armenian diaspora, with notable alumni including:

- Mkrtich Achemian – poet
- Kurken Alemshah – composer and conductor
- Arpiar Arpiarian – writer and political activist
- Arman Babajanyan – politician
- Ara Baliozian – author, translator and critic
- Nshan Beshiktashlian – poet, writer, satirist and novelist
- Arsen Chabanian – painter
- Edgar Chahine – painter
- Mihran Damadian – freedom fighter, political activist, writer and teacher
- Léon Gurekian – architect, writer and political activist
- Ohannés Gurekian – architect, engineer and alpinist
- Marco Khan – actor and stuntman
- Edgar Manas – composer
- Mikayel Minasyan – public figure, diplomat and media mogul
- Vahram Papazian – actor
- Tovmas Terzian – poet, playwright and professor
- Daniel Varoujan – poet
- Yervant Voskan – sculptor and teacher

== Architecture ==
Originally positioned on the third floor arched gable of the façade, the stone coat of arms of the Zenobio family has since been relocated to the internal garden of the palace.

The portego of the palace features three veduta and two etchings by Luca Carlevarijis.

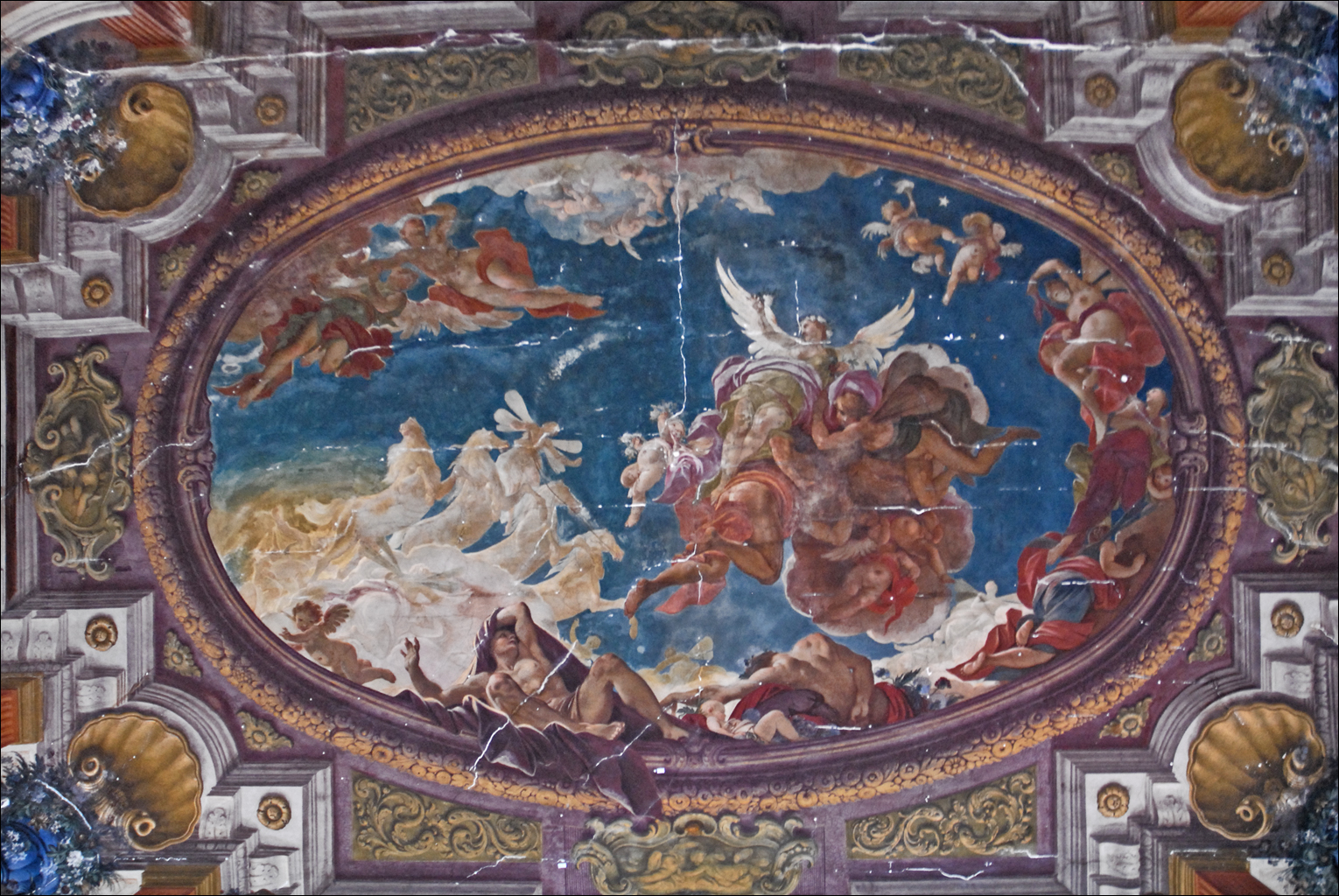
The Hall of Mirrors ceiling decoration, Allegory of the Dawn (Aurora), by Ludovico Dorigny (ca. 1685)

The Hall of Mirrors, or Sala degli Specchi, is a grand ballroom extending over two floors and facing onto the first-floor balcony. The ballroom and adjacent rooms feature frescoes decorated by Ludovico Dorigny, Gregorio Lazzarini, and a young Giovanni Battista Tiepolo, complemented by the stucco work of Abbondio Stazio. The panels depict mythologic scenes and the life of Queen Zenobia of the 3rd-century Palmyrene Empire, a putative ancestor of the Zenobio family.

Dorigny’s ceiling composition, Allegory of the Dawn (Aurora), features a quadratura framed by pilaster enriched with foliage and animated with male and female figures incarnating the Sciences and the Arts. In the center is a winged female figure representing Aurora, welcoming Apollo driving his four-horse sun chariot. Above, two putti in flight hold a torch and a bowl of dew, symbolising the dawn.

== In popular culture ==
The music video for Madonna's 1984 song "Like A Virgin" was filmed in the Hall of Mirrors, as well as for Laura Pausini's 2005 song "Vivimi".

The Italian film Viaggi di nozze, directed by Carlo Verdone, features a scene in front of the palace where Raniero and the palanquins emerge with the coffin in which Fosca rests.

Several scenes from episodes of the German television series Commissario Brunetti, including "Death in a Strange Country" (2006), "Wilful Behaviour" (2007) and "The Golden Egg" (2016), were filmed at Ca' Zenobio.

In Season 29, Episode 7 of the American reality competition show The Amazing Race, contestants took a water taxi to Ca' Zenobio to find their next clue.

== Gallery ==
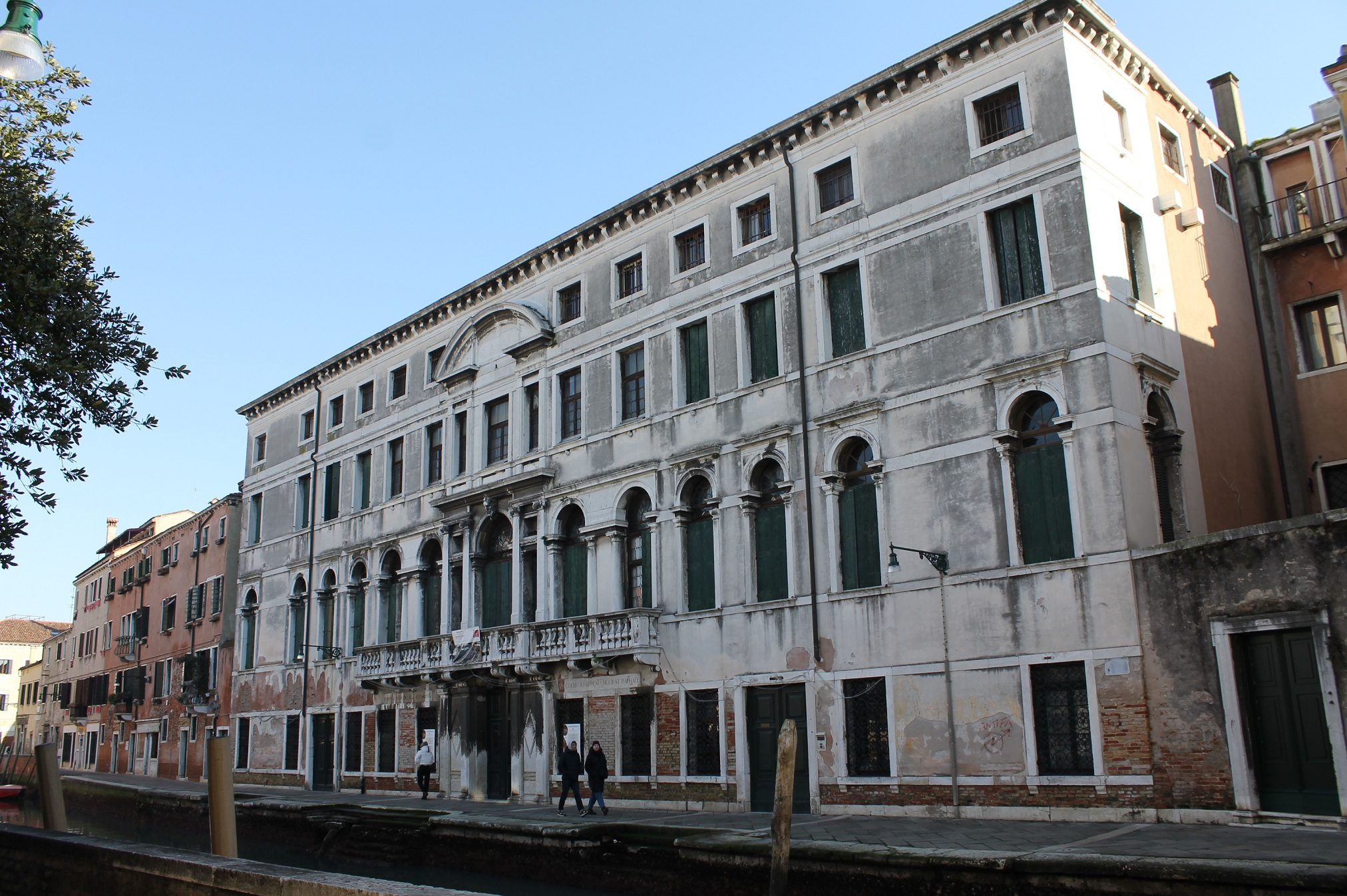

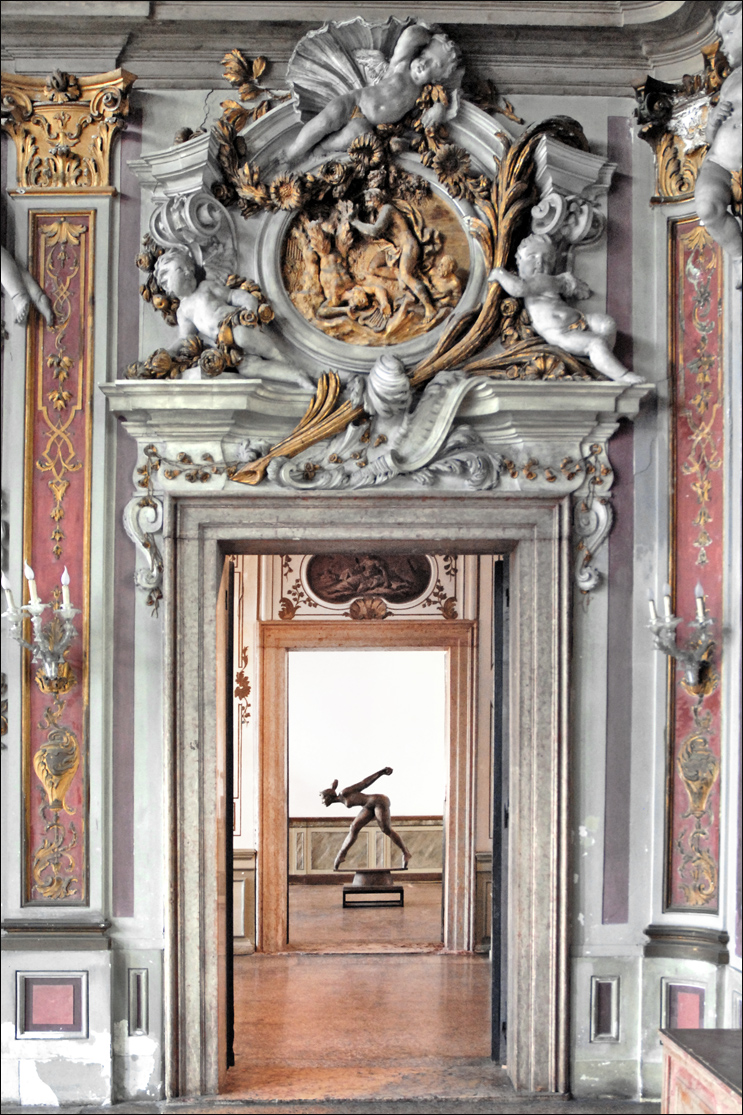

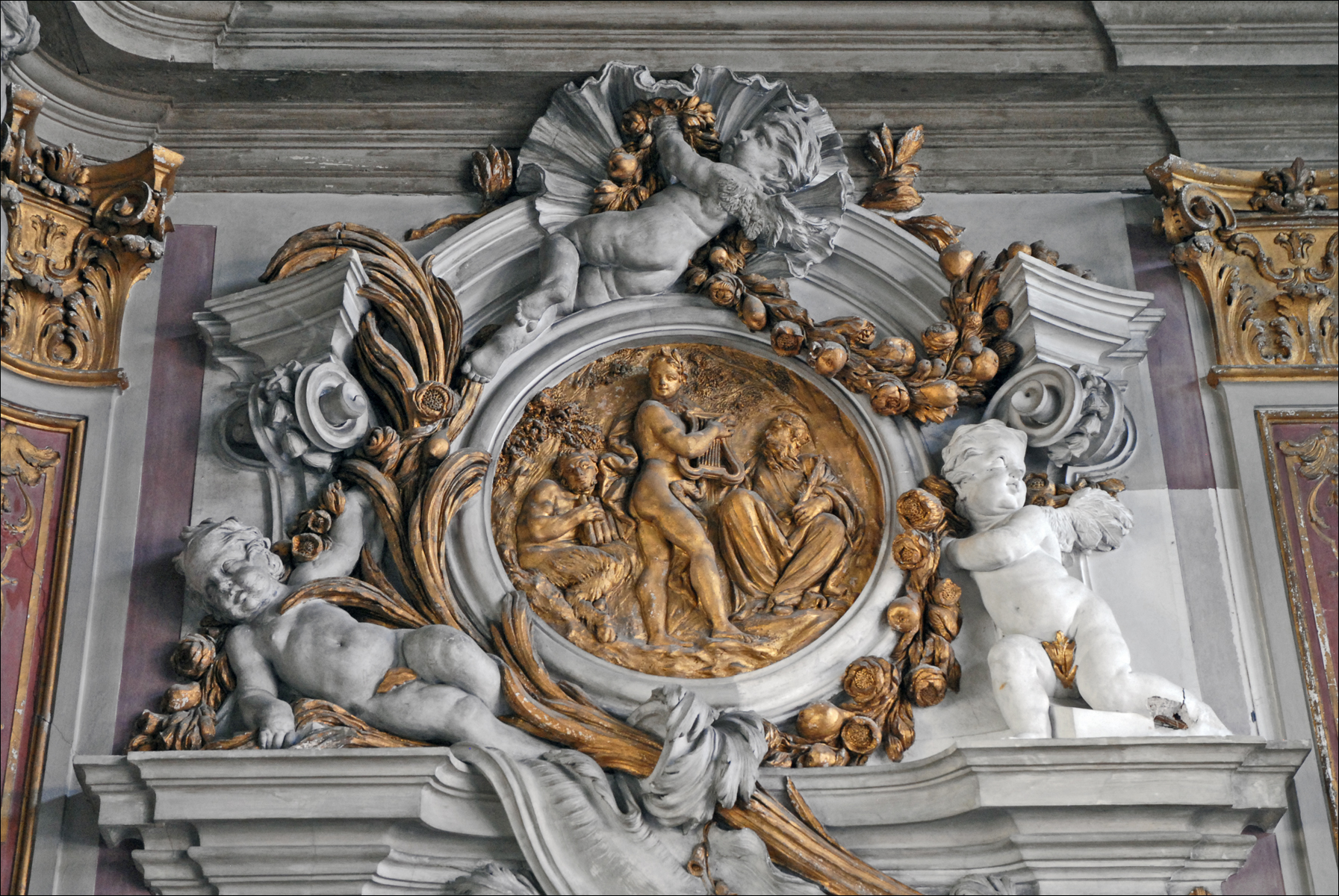
Stuccoed gilt medallion depicting Apollo and Marsyas

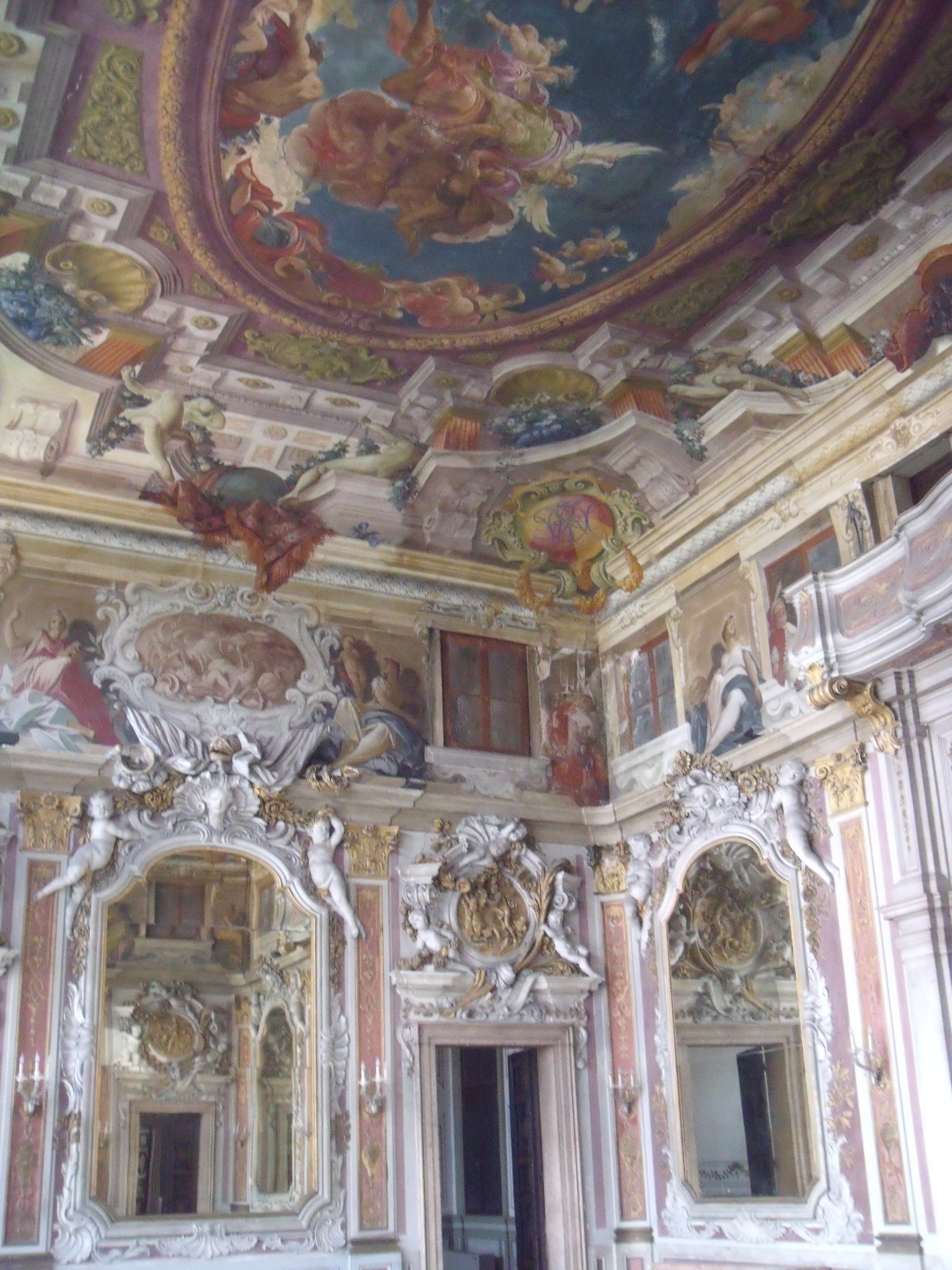
The Hall of Mirrors

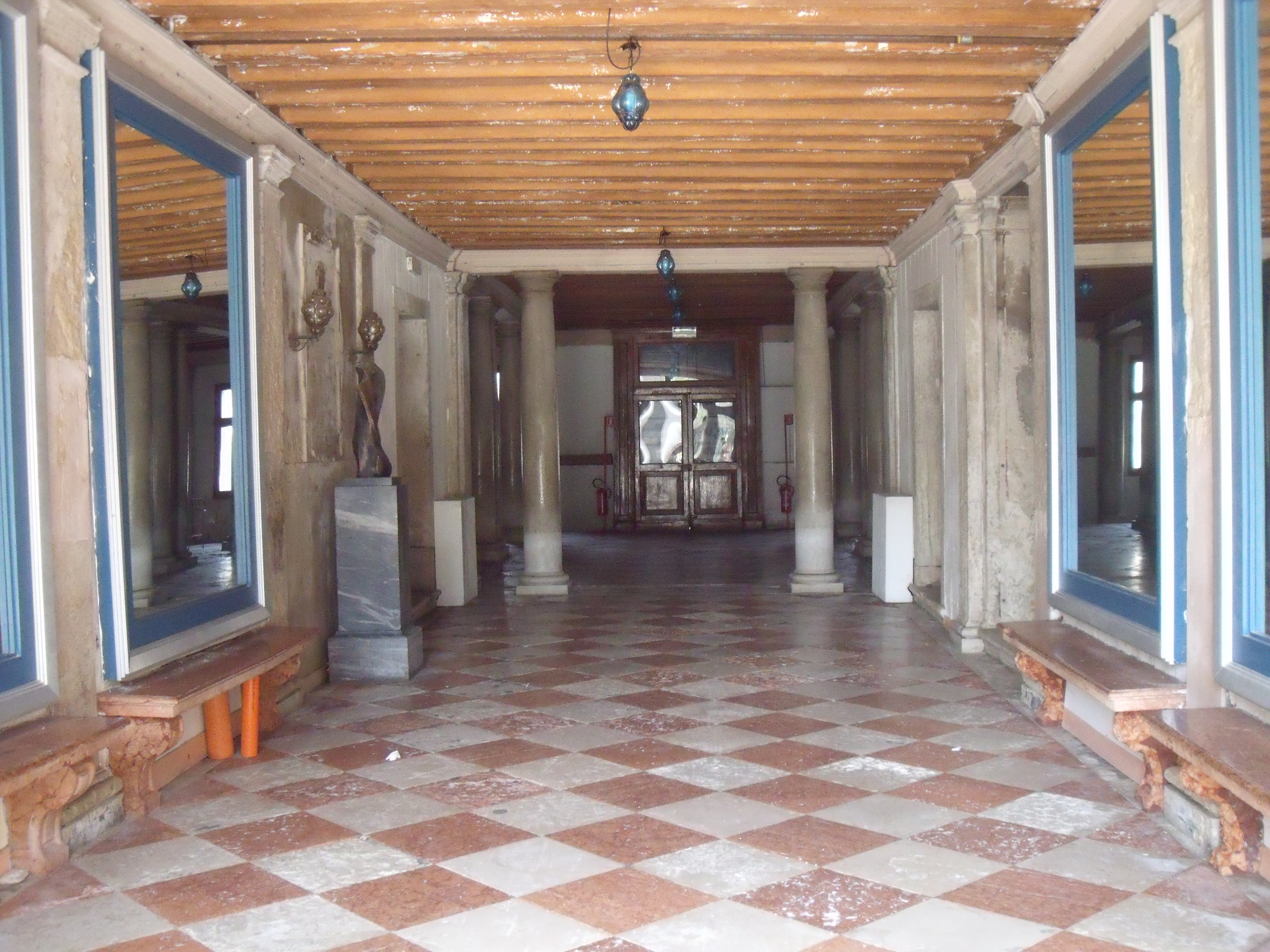

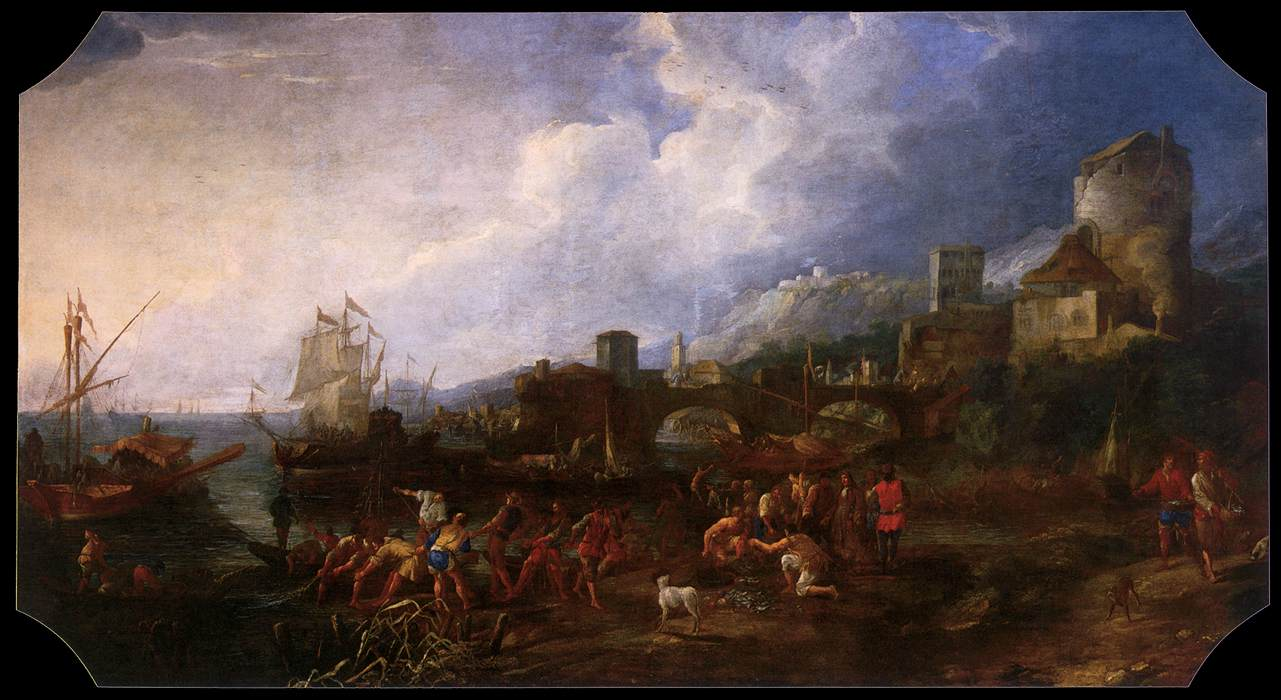
Seaport veduta by Luca Carlevarijs

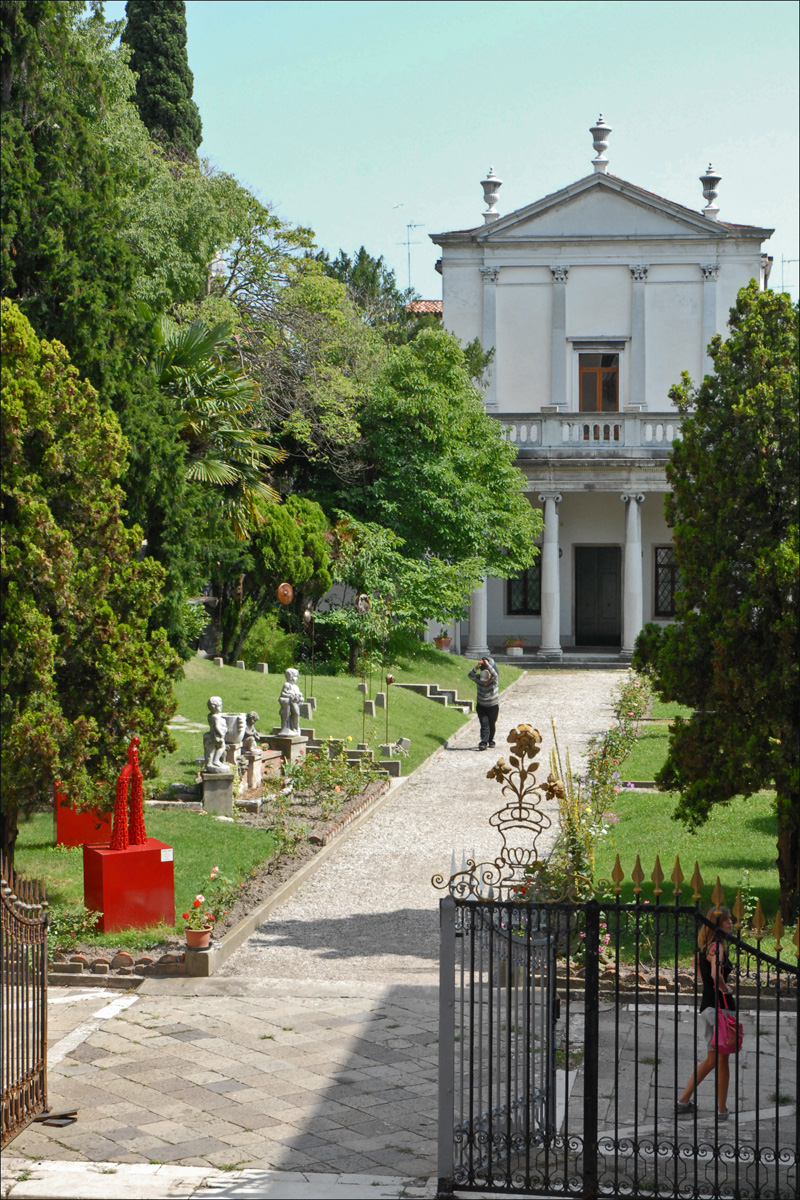

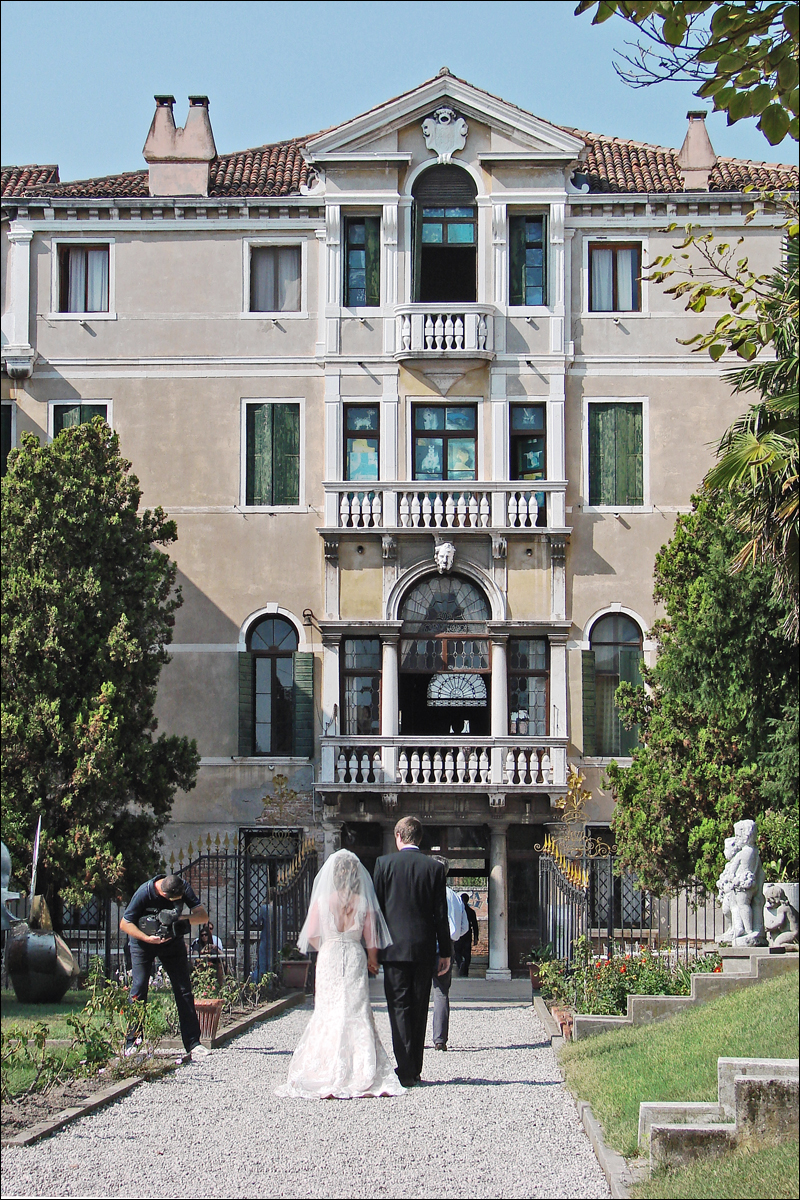
