= Setian =

Setian may refer to:

- Setian, a member of the Temple of Set
- Setian, a fictional species in the Something Wicked Saga
- Hovhannes Setian (1853–1930), Armenian short story writer, poet, and teacher
- Mikail Nersès Sétian (1918–2002), Turkish Armenian Catholic bishop

== See also ==
- Sethian, an adherent of Sethianism
