= Oganessian =

Oganessian (Ohanessian, etc.) (Armenian: Հովհաննիսյան) a variant of Hovhannisyan is a surname of Armenian origin derived from the Armenian given name Ohannes. People with such names include:

- Alina Oganesyan (born 2004), German rhythmic gymnast
- Armen Oganesyan (born 1954), CEO of Russian state radio station Voice of Russia
- Arsen Oganesyan (born 1990), Russian football player
- Beatrice Ohanessian (1927–2008), Iraqi-Armenian pianist
- Gaguik Oganessian (1947–2015), Armenian chess player, writer and organiser
- Khoren Oganesian (born 1955), Soviet footballer
- Marine Brenier-Ohanessian (born 1986) is a French politician
- Renata Oganesian (born 2001), Ukrainian pair skater
- Stepan Oganesyan (born 2001), Russian football player
- Yuri Oganessian (born 1933), Russian-Armenian nuclear physicist (the element oganesson is named to honor him)
