= Arthur Hovhannisyan =

Artur Hovhannisyan (Arthur Oganesyan) may refer to:

- Arthur Hovhannisyan (karateka) (born 1975), Armenian karateka
- Arthur Hovhannisyan (footballer) (born 1968), with Shirak F.C.; see 2002 FIFA World Cup qualification – UEFA Group 5
- Artur Hovhannisyan (boxer) (born 1996), Armenian boxer

== See also ==
- Hovhannisyan, a surname
