= Kurken Alemshah =

Turkish Armenian composer and conductor

Kurken M. Alemshah
- Born: 22 May 1907; Bardizag, Ottoman Empire (now Bahçecik, near İzmit, Turkey)
- Died: 14 December 1947 (aged 40); Detroit, Michigan, U.S.
- Occupations: composer and conductor

Kurken M. Alemshah (Armenian: Գուրգէն Մ. Ալէմշահ; 22 May 1907 – 14 December 1947) was an Armenian composer and conductor.

== Biography ==
Alemshah was born in Bardizag (now Bahçecik, near İzmit, Turkey). He began schooling in his hometown, but during the Armenian Genocide his parents sent him to Italy to continue his education at the Moorat-Raphael College in Venice. In 1923, when his teachers there became aware of his musical gifts, they enrolled him at the Milan Conservatory to study music.

Following his graduation, Alemshah joined the faculty of the Paris branch of the Murat-Raphaelian school, where he organized the Giligia choir, performing not only in Paris, but also traveling to Venice, directing the choir in an all-Komitas program at St. Mark's Square. Alemshah presented Tchouhadjian's popular comic opera Leblebidji Hor-Hor Agha (The Chickpea Vendor), and Haygagan harsanik (The Armenian Wedding), a composition put together by combining Alemshah's own melodies with popular songs. In 1937, Haygagan harsanik received second prize in an international competition in which twenty nations participated.

Concurrently, Alemshah conducted the Alakyaz Choir on a number of occasions, initially to mark the establishment of the Soviet regime in Armenia, and later to benefit the Armenian War Relief efforts. In 1939, he was appointed conductor of the Sipan-Komitas Chorus. He conducted Tigranian's opera Anush and performed the Armenian Divine Liturgy in a number of French cathedrals.

In the fall of 1947, Alemshah visited the United States for a series of appearances. In October, he conducted a concert at Town Hall, NY, devoted to Armenian orchestral and choral music. On 14 December 1947 he died in Detroit of a heart attack, a day before he was scheduled to perform in the city.

Some of his scores were published in Paris in 1947 and his manuscripts are reposited in the Charents Museum of Literature and Arts in Armenia. A CD of Alemshah's complete solo songs, performed by Elisabeth Pehlivanian, and some of his choral works rendered by Komitas Chamber Choir have been released.

== Selected works ==
=== Solo vocal ===
- Բուխուրիկ • Pukhurig (Stovepipe, 1934)
- Իմ երգը • Im yerkı (My Song)
- Ես սիրեցի • Yes siretsi (I Loved)
- Իմ եարը • Im yarı (My Beloved)
- Աղուորներուն • Aghvornerun (For the Lovely Maidens)
- Նազեր • Nazer (Coyness)
- Ծաղիկ էի • Dzaghig ei (I Was a Flower)
- Իղձ • Ights (Desire)
- Սիրելիս • Sirelis (My Love)
- Պճինկօ • Bjingo (A gangbang)

=== Choral ===
- Հայաստան • Hayasdan (Armenia)
- Անուշիկ եար ճան • Anushig yar jan (Beautiful Sweatheart)
- Մեր պարտիզում • Mer bardizum (In Our Garden)
- Հունձք • Huntsk (Harvest)
- Պլպուլն Աւարայրի • Blbuln Avarayri (The Nightingale of Avarayr)

=== Instrumental ===
- Lamento et dance arménienne (Lament and Armenian Dance) for vn & pn

=== Orchestral ===
- Արեւելեան գիշերներ • Arevelyan kisherner (Oriental Nights, 1931)
- Հէքեաթ • Hekyat (A Tale)
- Երկու պատմուածք հազար ու մէկ գիշերներէն • Yergu badmvadzk hazar u meg kisherneren (Two Stories from The Book of One Thousand and One Nights)

=== Vocal-Orchestral ===
- Աւարայրի պատերազմը • Avarayri baderazmı (The Battle of Avarayr, 1934)

=== Incidental music ===
- Վարդավառ • Vartavar (Transfiguration, 1932)
- Ծովինար • Dzovinar

== CD Recordings ==
- Elisabeth Pehlivanian - Songs with piano
- Armenian Composers of Asia Minor - Choral works
- Komitas
- The Battle of Avarayr
