= Ohannés Gurekian =

Armenian architect, engineer and alpinist

- Born: August 24, 1902; Constantinople, Ottoman Empire
- Died: March 1, 1984 (aged 81); Asolo, Italy
- Education: Moorat-Raphael College
- Occupations: Architect, Engineer, and Alpinist
- Partner(s): Léon Gurekian and Mariamik Azarian

Ohannés Gurekian (Armenian: Յովհաննէս Կիւրեղեան, Italian: Giovanni Giorgiano; August 24, 1902, in Constantinople – March 1, 1984, in Asolo) was an Armenian architect, engineer, and alpinist.

== Biography ==
=== Early life and education ===
Ohannés Gurekian, son of Léon Gurekian and Mariamik Azarian, was born August 24, 1902, in Constantinople. He emigrated with his parents to Italy in 1907, living briefly in Rome and then in Asolo. He studied at the Moorat-Raphael College in Venice.

At his father's direction, Ohannés enrolled in the school of engineering at the University of Padova, where he received a degree in Civil Engineering in 1924, and completed a specialization in Hydraulic Engineering in 1926 (though he never worked as a hydraulic engineer). Immediately after completing his specialization, he was apprenticed to the Architect Ballatore di Rosanna at his firm in Turin.

=== The Dolomites ===
After a brief period of collaboration with the engineer Bolzon, of Asolo, Ohannés moved to Frassené Agordino, which he had gotten to know as a regular vacation spot since 1922. Attracted by the mystique of the Dolomites, he established himself there as a civil engineer.

As a student, Ohannés had belonged to the Treviso chapter of the Italian Alpine Club and, having moved to Frassené, he joined the Agordo chapter. There he met the "Axis of Alpinism" Attilio Tissi, Giovanni and Alvise Andrich, and Domenico Rudatis. On the 25th of August 1929, he became the first to climb the "Torre Armena" peak of the Agner Mountain group.

In 1932 he was appointed Special Commissioner of Agordo's chapter of the Italian Alpine Club and, from 1933 to 1946, he was its president. In 1935 he collaborated with Ettore Castiglioni to draft the section of a guidebook for the Italian Alps relating to the southern chain of the Pale di San Martino.

He is considered a pioneer of modern alpinism of the Eastern Alps, and the refuge at Malga Losch, at the feet of the massif of Mount Agner (which he considered "his mountains") was dedicated to him posthumously. He dedicated himself to the promotion of tourism for Frassené, where he founded the first Italian "Pro Loco" association and in 1933 he became a member of the Provincial Tourism Council of (Belluno). From 1934 to 1946, in addition to his professional activities, he taught at the Mining Institute of Agordo.

In 1936 he Married Dina Della Lucia Dies (of Frassené). They had three children: Armen, Mannig, and Haïg.

=== Professional life ===
At the start of the Second World War Ohannés moved definitively to Asolo despite continuing, for the rest of his life, to retain professional ties in the Agordino valleys.

At the end of the war he was called to take part in the Committee for the Reconstruction of the Province of Belluno. He identified the traditional architectural styles which should be adopted for each area in need of reconstruction. He also designed the Reconstruction Plan for the town of Caviola, which had been burned down in retaliation by Nazi troops in (20–21 August 1944).

In 1948, driven by the necessity of updating his skills after the unproductive wartime, he enrolled in the School of Architecture and Urbanism of the Institut Polytechnique at the University of Losanna - Rector of architecture Jean André Tschumi. Despite Having completed his coursework there, his own work did not leave him with enough time to matriculate. His Professional work was fundamentally directed towards Urbanism, to public buildings, and to Industrial structures.

From 1964 on, his sons (first Armen and then Haig) collaborated with him in his Architectural Practice. He died in Asolo on 1 March 1984.

== Works and Significant Projects ==
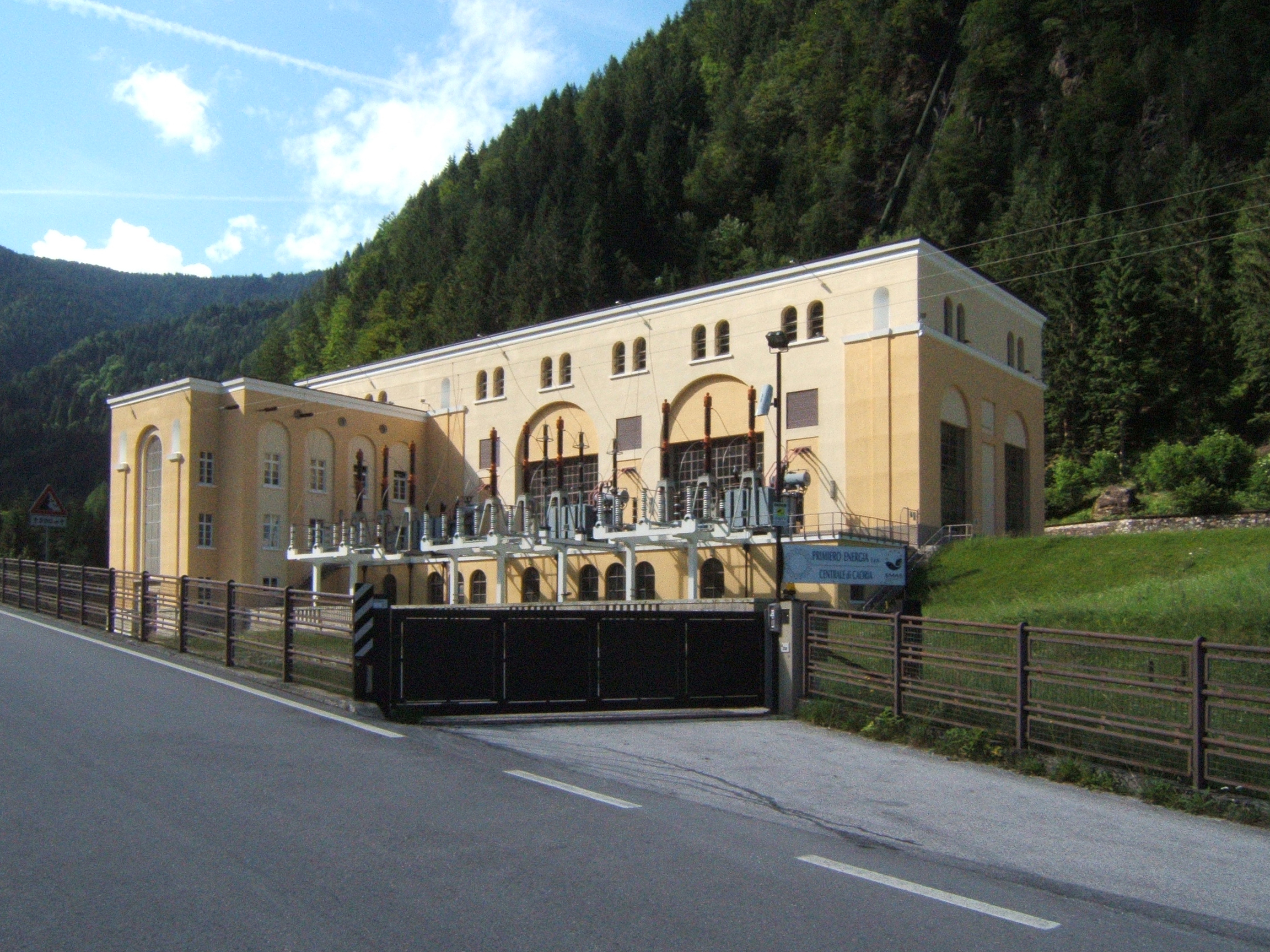
Hydroelectric Power Station of Caoria, 1941-1947

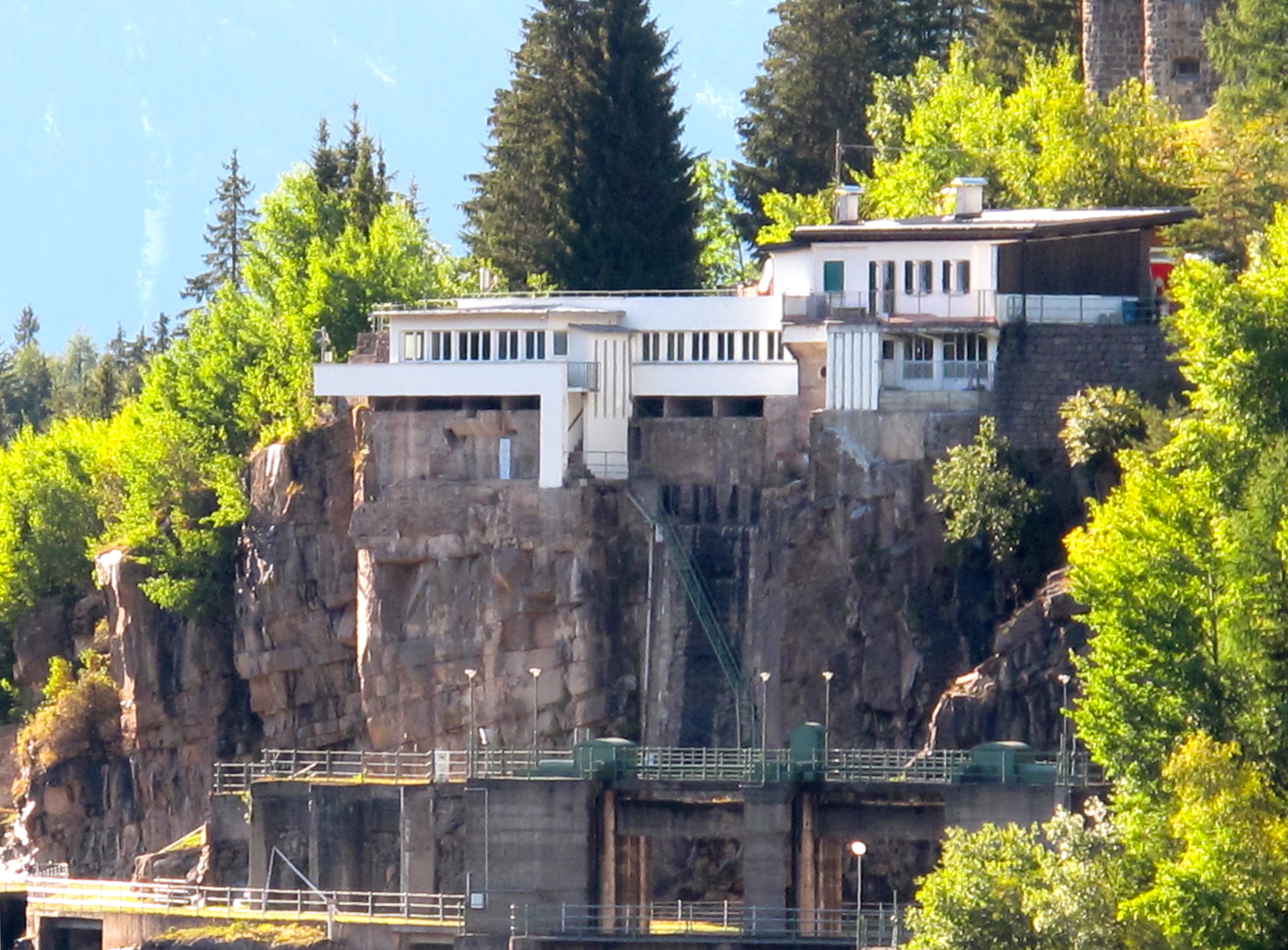
Command Center for the dam at Forte Buso sul Travignolo, 1953

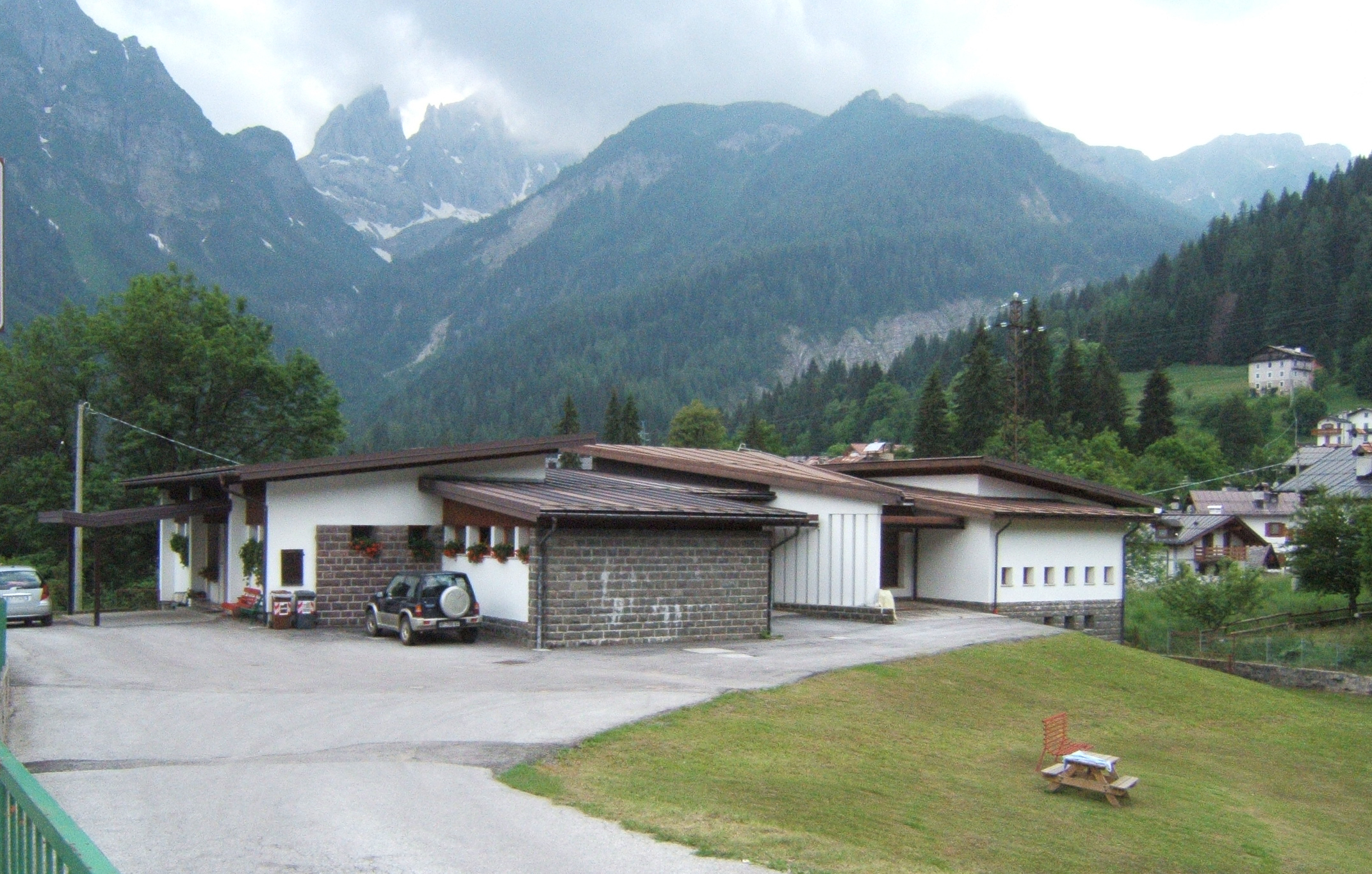
Elementary School of Falcade, 1956

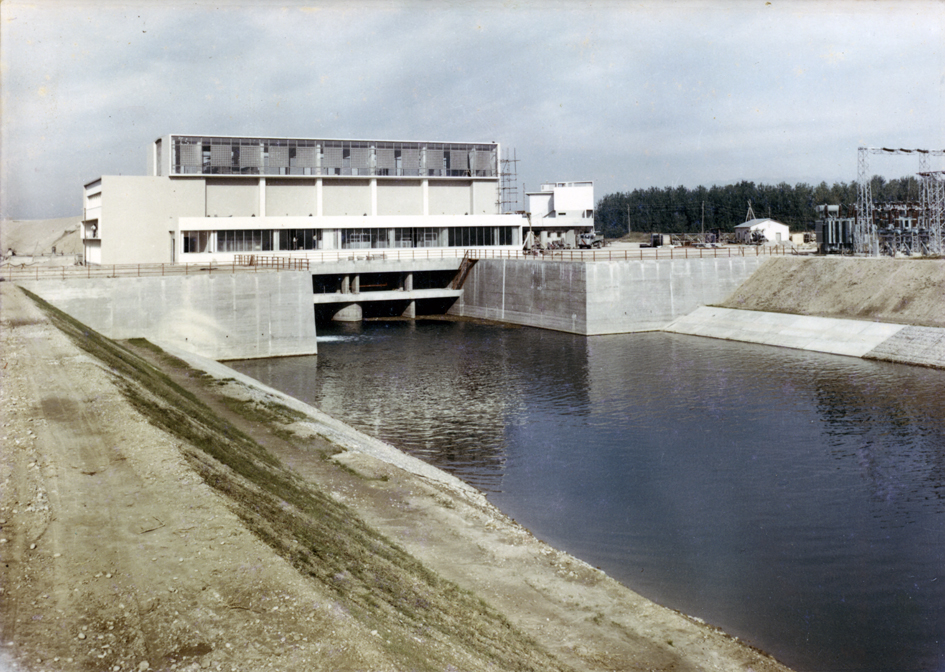
Hydroelectric Station at Zevio sull'Adige, 1958

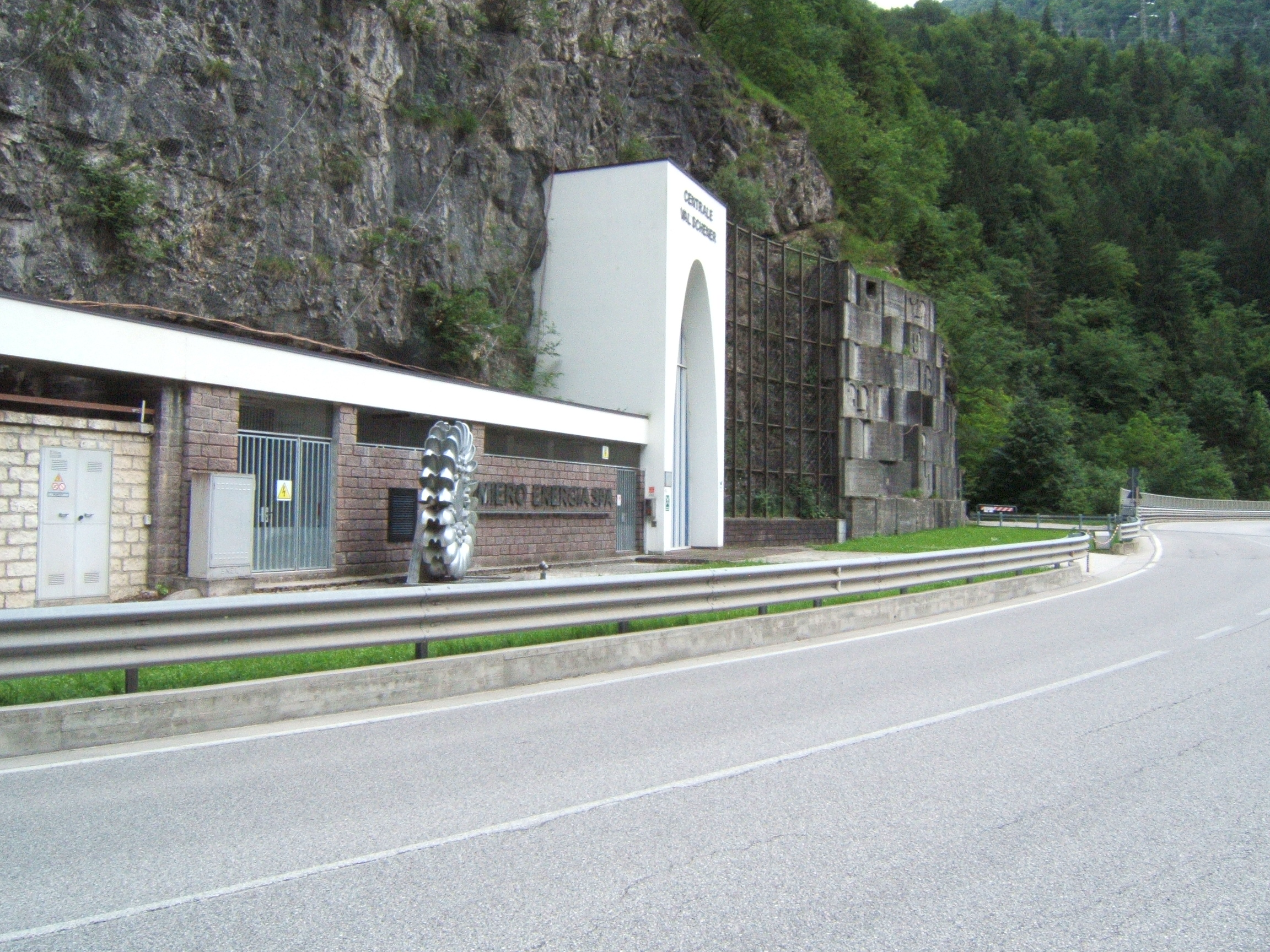
Hydroelectric Power Station in the Cavern at Val Schener, 1962

=== 1930 -1939 ===
- 1932 Agordo - Expansion and renovation of the Civic Hospital
- 1934 Frassené - Villa Parolari
- 1937 Monte Piana - Touristic/Historical Development Plan for Battlefields
- 1938 Agordo - Expansion and renovation of the Mining Institute
- 1939 Pieve di Livinallongo - regulatory plan of Arabba

=== 1940 - 1949 ===
- 1940 La Stanga - Employee's Village for the Hydroelectric Power Station
- 1941 Caoria - Hydroelectric Power Station (Completed in 1947) and residence for employees
- 1943 Saviner - Hydroelectric Power Station (first part)
- 1945 Caviola - Reconstruction Plan
- 1946 Pian Cansiglio - Reconstruction of five Barracks burned by Nazi troops (1944)
- 1949 Marghera - Reconstruction of three buildings for employees of the S.A.V.A. - Veneto Aluminum Society

=== 1950 - 1959 ===
- 1950 Passo Duran - Refuge "Cesare Tomé" of the Italian Alpine Club
- 1950 Saviner - Hydroelectric Power Station - Second phase expansion and central habitation
- 1950 Voltago - Preschool
- 1951 Agordo - warden's house for the dam at S. Cipriano
- 1951 Agordo - Topological and Volumetric plan for the Edifici Masoch
- 1952 Falcade - Manufacturing program
- 1952 Falcade - City Hall
- 1952 Cime d'Auta - Refuge "Alvise Andrich"- Italian Alpine Club Alpino (First project not completed)
- 1953 Alleghe - Villa De Lorenzi
- 1953 Arsié - Hydroelectric Power Station and habitation for command center and shift workers
- 1953 Forte Buso - Command Center for the dam on the Travignolo
- 1954 Marghera - Two habitational compounds for the employees of S.A.V.A. - Veneto Aluminum Society
- 1956 Frassené - Church and Belltower
- 1957 Quero - Hydroelectric power station and Compound for Workshops and housing for command and shift workers.
- 1957 Redipuglia - Transformer Substation and Compound for Workshops and housing for command and shift workers.
- 1958 Zevio - Hydroelectric Power Station on the Adige, Control Center Barrier, Workshop and habitation for workers
- 1959 Selva di Cadore - City Hall

=== 1960 - 1969 ===
- 1960 Colle S. Lucia - City Hall
- 1961 Marghera - Expansion and renovation of the executive offices of the Veneto Aluminum Society
- 1961 Val Schener - Command Center for water intake system
- 1961 Frassené - Expansion of Rifugio Scarpa - Italian Alpine Club
- 1961 Gron - Parish Church
- 1962 Lappach (Selva dei Molini) - Hydroelectric power station
- 1962 Val Schener - Hydroelectric power station in cavern, Access Gate, Command Center, and Warden's residence.
- 1964 Longarone - Plan for Parish Church (First plan was not completed)
- 1965 Falcade - General regulatory plan
- 1965 Selva di Cadore - Plan for the allotment of S.Fosca
- 1966 Livinallongo - General regulatory plan
- 1966 Longarone - Plan for Parish Church (Second plan was not completed)
- 1967 Selva di Cadore - Manufacturing program
- 1967 Mschicca (Libano) - Educational Compound (Contest)
- 1967 Frassené - Preschool
- 1969 Forca Rossa - Refuge "Alvise Andrich"- Italian Alpine Club (second project not completed)
- 1969 Voltago - Building Regulation

=== 1970 - 1984 ===
- 1970 Longarone - Social Center (not completed)
- 1975 Teheran - residential complex Garni (project) (contest)

along with many educational structures and individual homes

== Bibliography ==
- Fondazione Architettura Belluno Dolomiti - Fulvio Bona, Tommaso Del Zenero, Sara Gnech, Ohannés Gurekian, L'ingegneria, L'architettura, L'Urbanistica, Istituto Bellunese di Ricerche Sociali e Culturali, ISBN 978-88-98941-27-8, Godega S.Urbano, 2021.
