= Mkrtich Achemian =

Armenian poet

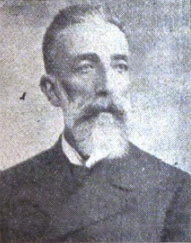
Mkrtich Achemian

Mkirtich Achemian (Armenian: Մկրտիչ Աճէմեան; 1838–1917) was an ethnic Armenian poet.

== Biography ==
Achemian was born in 1838 in Ortaköy, a suburb of Constantinople and received his early education in a local Armenian school. Beginning in 1852, he continued his education at the Moorat-Raphael College in Venice where he developed his literary talent under Ghevont Alishan. He returned to Constantinople in 1858 and started working for the State Telegraph Administration, he kept this job for most of his life.

Achemian's poems were published in various newspapers and periodicals, and were eventually collected into three books. Smiles and Tears (Ժպիտք եւ արտասուք, 1871), Light and Shadows (Լոյս եւ ստուերք, 1878) and Spring Winds (Գարնան հովեր, 1892). In 1908 he published all three books as one volume, with additional poems that he had written since 1892. He also published a collection of translated poems, Diverse Translations (Զանազան թարգմանութիւնք).

Achemian's poems are written in refined Modern Armenian, they are delicate and reach in rhymes that impart a certain musicality. He was a poet of the romantic school, but kept traces of classicism. He was a renowned poet in his time, but he was unwilling or unable to change his style of poetry which lost its flavor in the 1880s.
