= Hovhannes Vahanian =

Hovhannes Vahanian (Armenian: Հովհաննես Վահանյան), 1832 in Constantinople, Ottoman Empire - 1891 in Constantinople) was an Ottoman politician, minister, social activist, writer, and reformer of Armenian descent. He was the brother of Srpouhi Dussap.
