= Gayane Hovhannisyan =

Armenian linguist

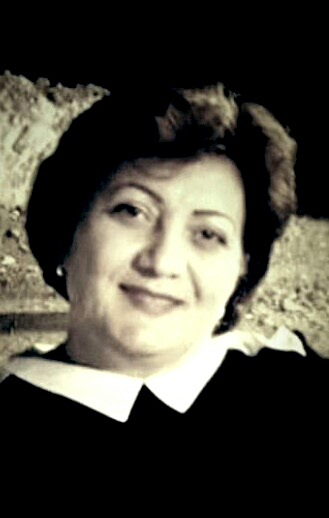
- Born: March 6, 1965 (age 61); Yerevan, Armenia
- Education: Yerevan Brusov State University of Languages and Social Sciences
- Occupations: Linguist, psycholinguist, language educator

Gayane Hovhannisyan (Գայանե Հովհաննիսյան, born 6 March 1965) is an Armenian linguist and professor. She holds the habilitation (D.Sc.) in Philology (Linguistics) and a professor’s title from Yerevan Brusov State University of Languages and Social Sciences.

== Biography ==
Hovhannisyan was born in 1965 in Yerevan. In 1987, she graduated from Yerevan Brusov State University of Languages and Social Sciences with honors. In 1993, she obtained her PhD in General and Applied Linguistics from the Institute of Linguistics of the Russian Academy of Sciences in Moscow. In 2000, she was awarded the Doctor of Sciences (D.Sc.) degree in Linguistics in Armenia.

She has held academic teaching and administrative positions in Armenia, the Russian Federation, and Oman. From 1996 to 2001, she taught English linguistics and Psycholinguistics at Yerevan State University. Between 2000 and 2007, she served as the founding head of the English Language and Teaching Methodology Chair at the Armenian State Pedagogical University. At different times, she served as the Head of the English Communication and Translation Chair at Yerevan State Linguistic University (2008–2012, 2021-2024).

From 2013 to 2021, Hovhannisyan taught English at the University of Technology and Applied Sciences in Muscat, Oman.

== Research ==
Hovhannisyan’s research focuses on Psycholinguistics, cognitive and Cultural linguistics, Semantics, Translation studies, and Digital humanities. Her work examines linguistic and cultural categorization, associative semantic systems, Language consciousness, and social and psychological aspects of language use. She conducted research at George Mason University, Appalachian State University, University of Cambridge, Cambridge, UK, European Centre for Modern Languages. In recent years, her research has also addressed the preservation and translation of cultural knowledge (simple knowledge and ontologies) in the context of digital humanities and Endangered Archives Programme of the British Library.

== Publications ==
Hovhannisyan has authored 14 scholarly books, over a hundred book chapters, and peer-reviewed journal articles in Armenian and international academic venues. Her publications are indexed in international databases such as Google Scholar, ORCID, ResearchGate, Academia.edu and Scopus.

=== Monograph ===
- The Psycholinguistic Concept of Time. Yerevan: Paruyr Sevak, 2001.

=== Selected articles and chapters ===
- Hovhannisyan, Gayane R. (2018). "The time of human thoughts and deeds". Cognitive Linguistic Studies. 5 (2): 410–425. doi:10.1075/cogls.00027.hov.
- Hovhannisyan, Gayane R. (2022). "Psycholinguistic Competencies and Interculturality in ELT". Individual and Contextual Factors in the English Language Classroom. English Language Education. Vol. 24. pp. 15–33. doi:10.1007/978-3-030-91881-1_2. ISBN 978-3-030-91880-4.
- Hovhannisyan, Gayane R. (2022). "The Architecture of Language Personality". Individual and Contextual Factors in the English Language Classroom. English Language Education. Vol. 24. pp. 79–95. doi:10.1007/978-3-030-91881-1_5. ISBN 978-3-030-91880-4.
- Hovhannisyan, Gayane R.; Harutyunova, Kristina A.; Hambardzumyan, Hayk B.; Aydinyan, Srbuhi (2025). "Empowering ESL Translation Studies: Integrating Machine Translation for Enhanced Language Proficiency and Productivity". Translation, Translanguaging and Machine Translation in Foreign Language Education. pp. 437–456. doi:10.1007/978-3-031-82174-5_21. ISBN 978-3-031-82173-8.
- Hovhannisyan, Gayane (2026). "Mkhitar Gosh's Girq Datastani in the Context of Digital Semantics". Bulletin of Armenian Libraries: 24. doi:10.52027/18294685-hn.2.25-05.
- Tamrazyan, Hamest; Hovhannisyan, Gayane; Harutyunyan, Arsen (2026). "From Stone to Standards: A Digital Heritage Interoperability Model for Armenian Epigraphy within the Leiden and EpiDoc Frameworks". Heritage. 9: 27. doi:10.3390/heritage9010027.
