= St. Hovhannes Church =

St. Hovhannes Church may refer to several former Armenian churches in the Nakhchivan Autonomous Republic of Azerbaijan:

- St. Hovhannes Church (Chalkhangala), in Kangarli district
- St. Hovhannes Church (Dyrnys), in Berdak, Ordubad district
- St. Hovhannes Church (Jahri), in Babek district
- St. Hovhannes Church (Tumbul), in Nakhchivan city
- St. Hovhannes-Mkrtich Church (Yukhari Aylis), in Ordubad district

== See also ==
- Surp Hovhannes Church, Byurakan, a 10th-century basilica in Aragatsotn Province, Armenia
- Surp Hovhannes Church of Voskevaz, a basilica in Aragatsotn Province, Armenia
- St. John's Church (disambiguation)
