= Léon Gurekian =

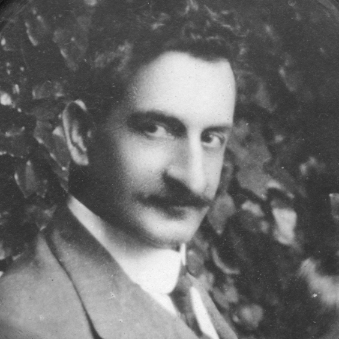
- Léon Gurekian
- Born: 26 April 1871; Constantinople, Ottoman Empire
- Died: 2 September 1950 (aged 79); Asolo, Italy
- Occupations: Architect, writer and political activist

Léon Gurekian (Armenian: Լեւոն Կիւրեղեան, Italian: Leonardo Giorgiano; 26 April 1871 in Constantinople – 2 September 1950 in Asolo) was an Ottoman Armenian architect, writer and political activist. He was active in the Ottoman Empire, Bulgaria and Italy.

== Biography ==
Léon Gurekian, the son of Hovhannes Gurekian and Prapion Yeremian, was born in Constantinople on 26 April 1871. His Armenian family originated and resided in Trebizond and worked in business relations between the Middle East and Europe, especially Marseille.

He first studied in Trebizond before completing his studies at the Mechitarist Moorat-Raphael College in Venice in 1888. He then went to Rome where he graduated in 1895 both from the "Regio Istituto di Belle Arti di Roma" with the Diploma of Professor of architectural design and from the "Regia Scuola di Applicazione degli Ingegneri" with a degree in architecture.

He married Mariamik Azarian in 1901, in Constantinople. Their only son, Ohannés Gurekian, was born in 1902 and was also an architect.

== Career ==
=== Bulgaria ===
Shortly after returning to Constantinople in 1896, he managed to escape the pogroms of the Armenians by the Sultan Abdul Hamid II by taking refuge in Bulgaria. After getting his architecture degree recognized by the Bulgarian Government, he designed various buildings and won the contest to design the Municipal Professional Theatre in Varna which was later built with only slight modifications by Bulgarian architect Nikola Lazarov.

=== Constantinople ===
Returning to Constantinople in 1899, Gurekian designed numerous buildings in the town and on the islands of Prinkipo (Islands of Prince, Büyükada). During his period he had contacts with the architects of the Balyan family, which family archive includes many original drawings and photos. During this period Gurekian was also intensely politically active, publishing under a pseudonym in Armenian newspapers.

=== Italy ===
On 7 September 1907, he moved suddenly and without apparent explanation to Rome.

In 1908 he obtained from the Regio Istituto di Belle Arti di Roma in Rome, the Diploma of Professor of Architectural Design, on the basis of his studies there in architecture in 1895.

In 1911 he designed and built the Ottoman Pavilion to the International Exhibition in Turin. This is one of the only works he designed in Italy, the others being the funeral chapel of a friend of his in Trieste and his home - Villa Ararat - in Asolo, Treviso.

In September 1911 he was appointed representative of the Ottoman Government to the International Congress of architects in Rome, but while there the Italo-Turkish War arose and he participated as a regular member of the Association of Architects which was already part.

Starting in 1911, and increasingly in subsequent years, he spent time in Asolo which was also the summer residence of the Armenian College in Venice. For several years from 1921 onwards, he went in vacation in Frassené in the province of Belluno where the environment reminded him of Toz at Trebizond, where his family had a summer residence during his childhood.

In 1912 he began a long project to survey important monuments of Byzantine and Romanesque Architecture in Ravenna, Aquileia, Istria, Dalmatia and especially in Brianza with the aim of studying the influence of Armenian Architecture on Romanesque Architecture. This was in opposition to the thesis of G.T. Rivoira.

From 1914–1918 the First World War forced him to stay in Asolo where he made a living as a photographer.

In 1919 he went to Paris where he published a political analysis of World War I in the form of an animal allegory: "The Responsible". While there he also participated in political efforts towards the constitution of the Independent Republic of Armenia.

In 1922, becoming bitterly aware of the impossibility of returning to what would be the Independent Armenian Republic given the failure of the Treaty of Versailles (1919), he decided to settle in Asolo and designed and built his home there.

From that moment, he totally abandoned architecture. He published a series of political and philological studies, mostly in the Armenian language. In "Kars and Ardahan" he put forward the Armenian claim to those provinces, which were ceded to Turkey in the Treaty of Alexandropol.

At the end of the Second World War a Delegation of the Soviet Armenian Republic went to Asolo to ask Gurekian if he was willing to move to Armenia. Being already sick he refused, but stated in support of that cause that: behind me there was always a photograph of General Antranik (Andranik Ozanian).

He died in Asolo on 2 September 1950 and was buried in family grave.

== Architectural Contributions ==
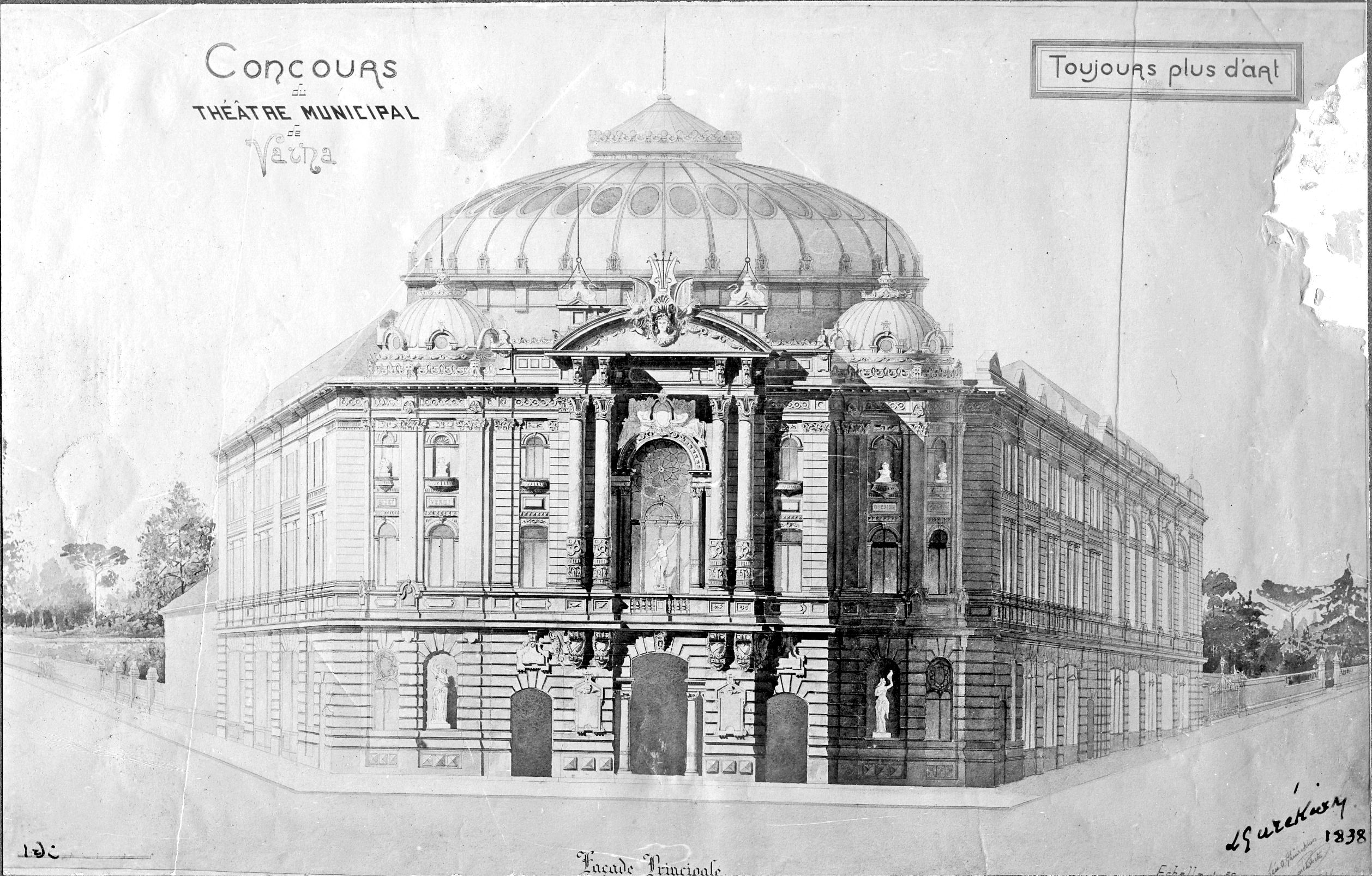
Theater in Varna - competition

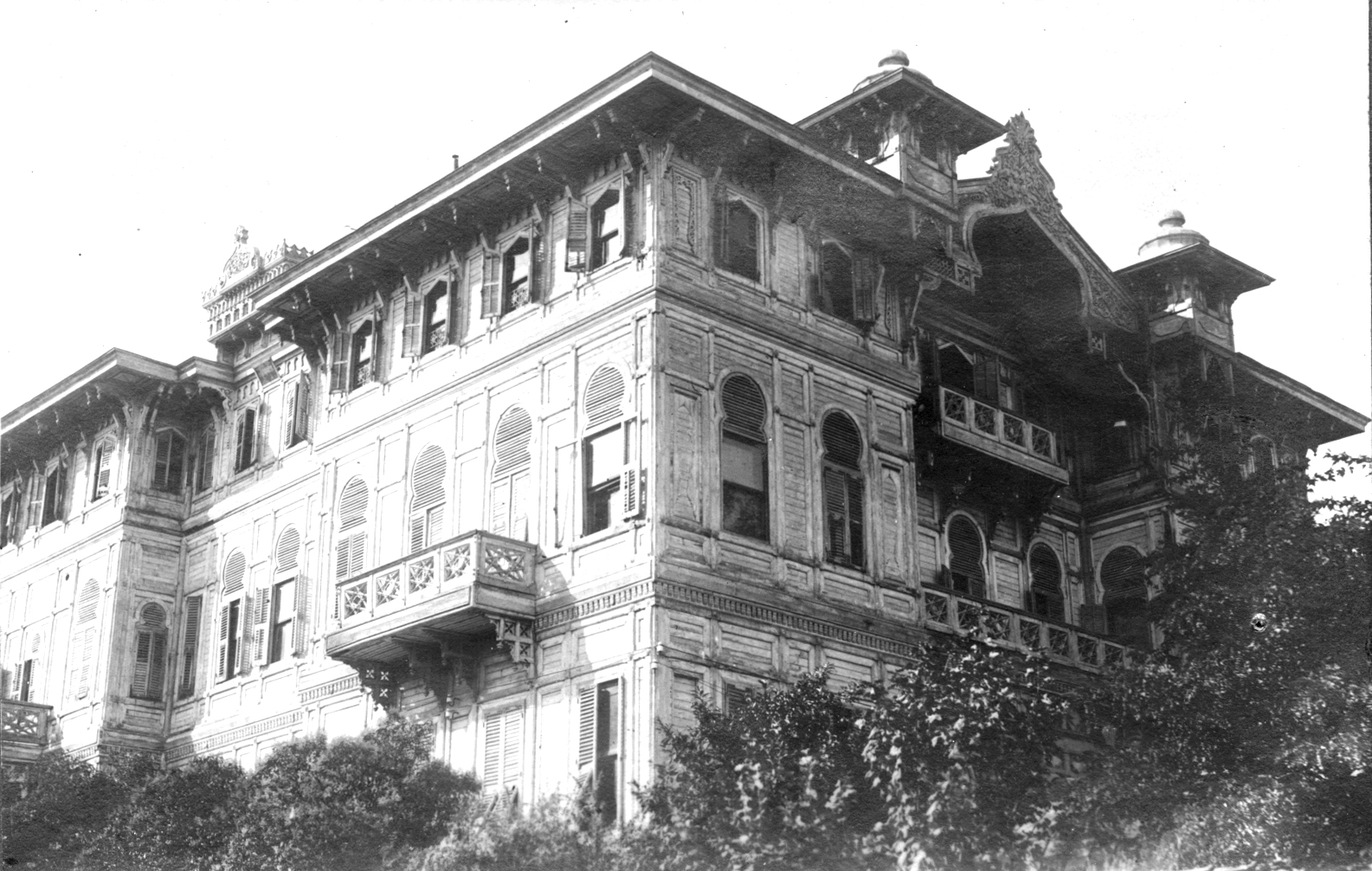
Palace of the Grand Vizir Halil Riphath, Pacha - Nichan Tachy - Constantinople

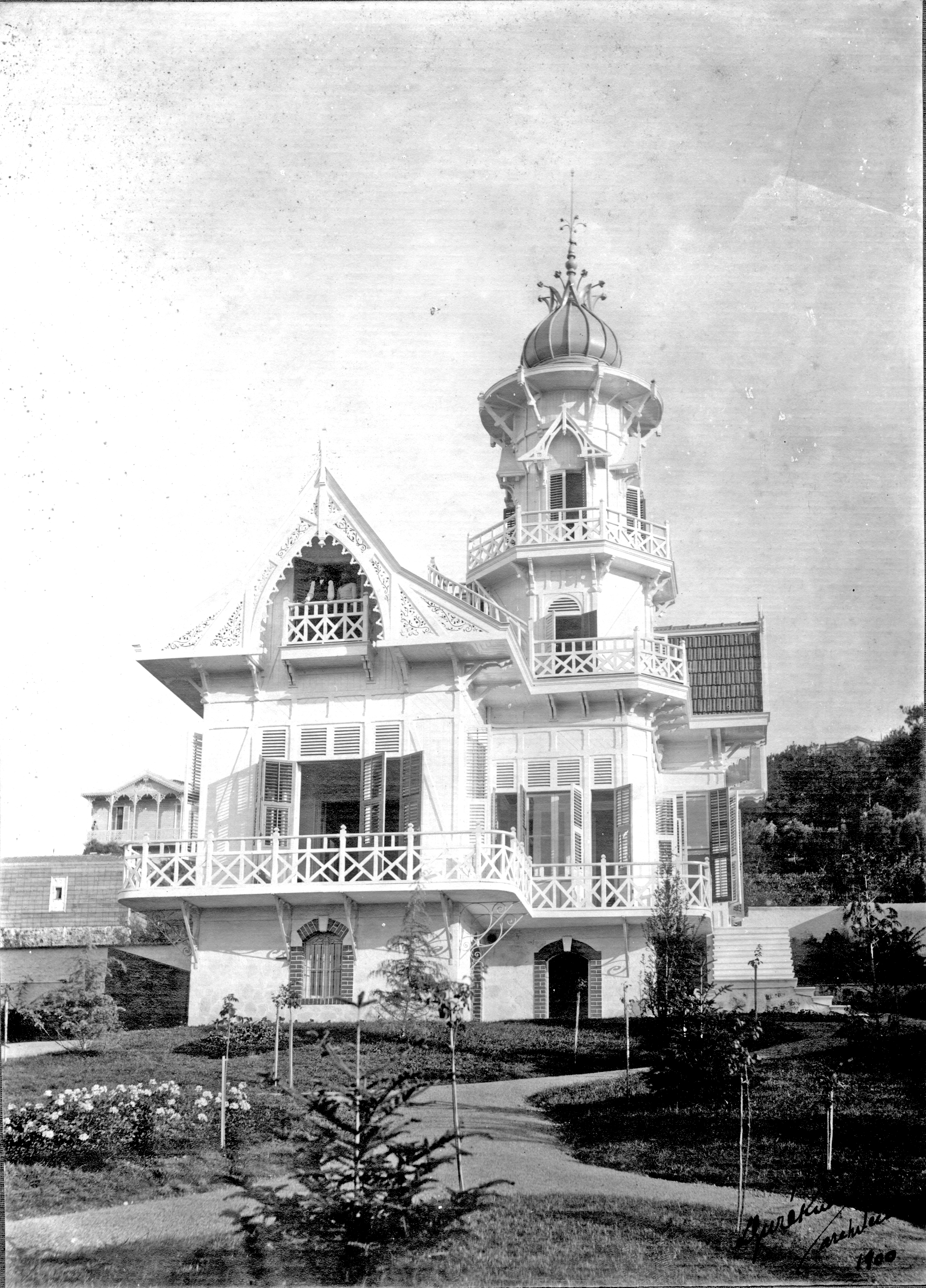
Villa Moustafa Bey - Prinkipo (Büyükada)

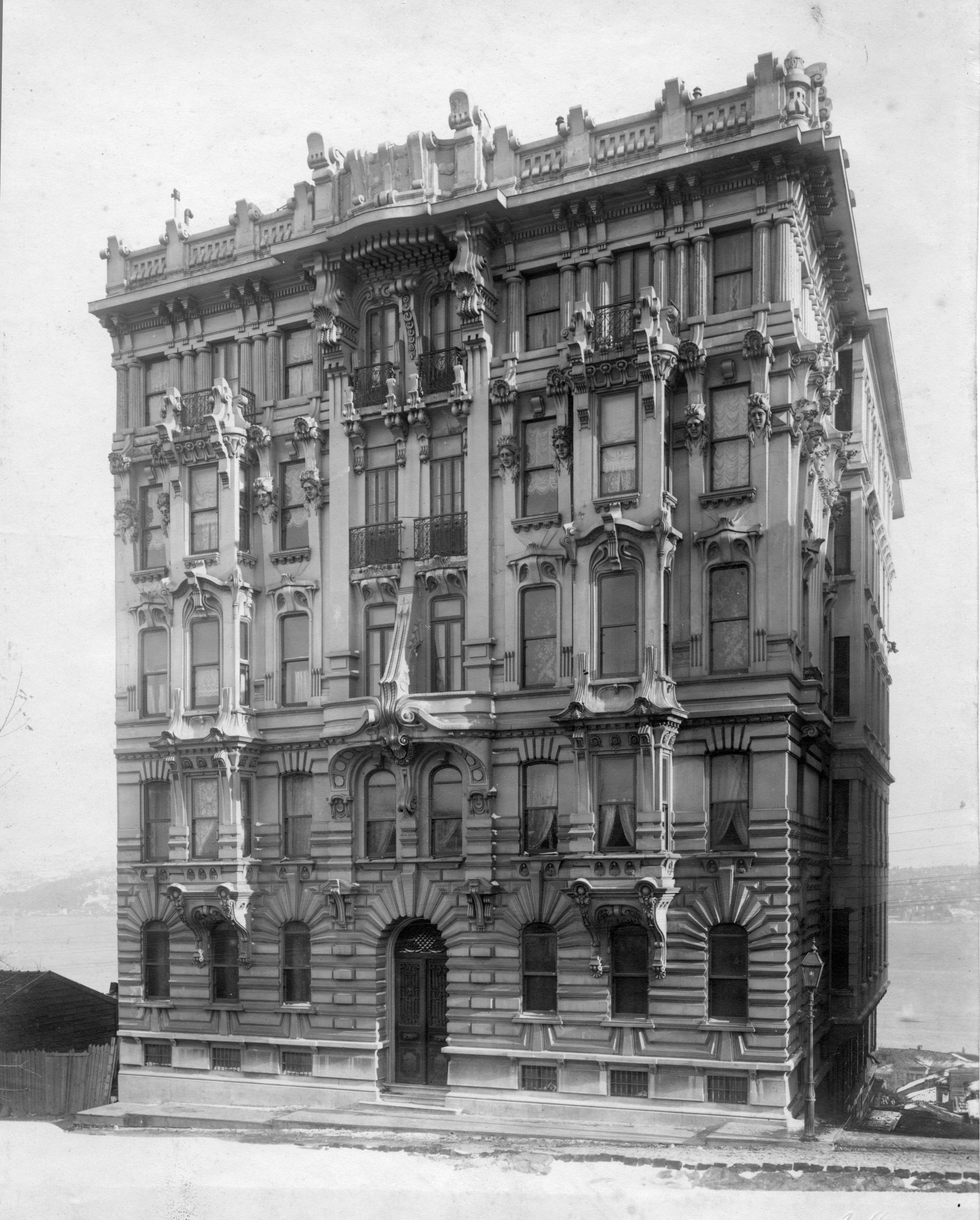
Appartamenti Apartments Azarian - Ayaz Pacha (today Gümüssuyu Palas) - Constantinople

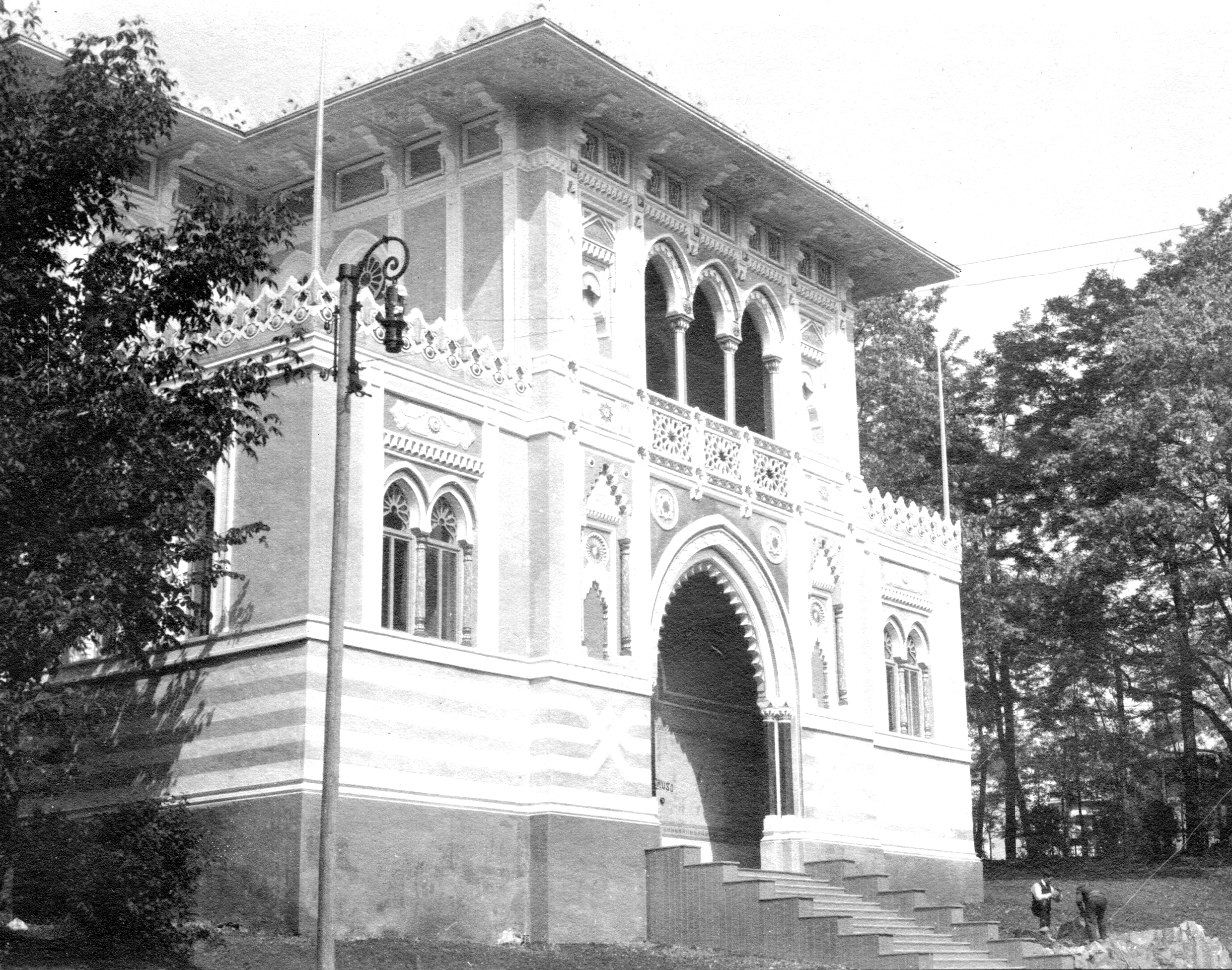
Pavilion of the Ottoman Empire at the International Exhibition - Torino

=== Bulgaria 1896-1898 ===
- 1897
  - Casino - Kasorlik
  - Agricultural Cash and Savings - Sofia and other cities
  - Villa - Sofia
  - Villa of the ing. Nicolof - Sofia
- 1898
  - Theater in Varna - competition (first prize)

=== Ottoman Empire 1898-1907 ===
- 1898
  - Armenian Church - Trabzon
  - Accommodation of Sisters - Samsoun
  - Church Our Lady of Lourdes of Georgian Fathers - Constantinople
- 1899
  - Dwelling Mndighian - Constantinople
  - Home of Ghiridli Moustafa Pacha - Sultan Ammed - Constantinople
  - Palace of the Grand Vizir Halil Riphath, Pacha - Nichan Tachy - Constantinople
  - Villa Hilmi view Bey - Bebek - Constantinople
- 1900
  - Apartments Munif Pacha - Constantinople
  - Apartments Ibraïm Bey Effendi - Constantinople
  - Pavilion for Rachid Pacha - Balta Limar - Constantinople
  - Palace (S)aleddin Pacha - Constantinople
  - Palace Hairiz - Constantinople
  - Palace and pavilions Hassan Pacha - Constantinople
  - Palace Kemaleddine Pacha - Constantinople
  - Palace and Guard House Moustafa Bey on the Bosphorus - Hissar - Constantinople
  - Villa Candilli - Constantinople
  - Villa Moustafa Bey - Prinkipo
  - Villa Sami Pacha - Constantinople
- 1903
  - Villa Agopian - Prinkipo
  - Apartments Joseph Azarian - Ayaz Pacha (today Gümüssuyu Palas) - Constantinople
- 1904
  - Apartments Rosenthal - Constantinople
  - Houses in S. Hagop (10 houses) - Constantinople
  - Accommodation gardens Azarian - Pendik
- 1905
  - Apartments Gurekian (two buildings) - Pangalti Rue Pariaz - Constantinople
  - Dwelling Chahbaz Maksoud - Chichli - Constantinople
- 1906
  - Apartments E. Schahnazar - Constantinople
  - Apartments Léon Gurekian - Constantinople - Ayaz Pacha
  - Apartments Coumbaradji - Constantinople
  - Funerary chapel Yeranouhi Keutcheyan - Constantinople
- Undated
  - Dwelling Karamanian - Constantinople
  - Dwelling Vedat Bey - Constantinople
  - Dwelling Vefik Bey - Constantinople
  - Apartments Yechil - Constantinople
  - Apartments Karamanian - Constantinople
  - Apartments Macsoud Bey - Asman Bey - Constantinople
  - Apartments Manouelian - Chichli - Constantinoplev
  - Apartments Perouz Agha - Constantinople

=== Italy 1908-1950 ===
- 1911
  - Pavilion of the Ottoman Empire at the International Exhibition - Torino
- 1913
  - Funerary chapel family Aïdinian - Trieste
- 1924
  - Villa Ararat - Asolo (Treviso)

== Publications ==
- Léon Gurekian, Il Concilio Cattolico Armeno di Roma, Considerazioni di un Patriota Armeno, Conti e Gandolfi, Sanremo 1912 - (in Italian)
- Léon Gurekian, The centenary of a couple of poets , Centenary of the birth of Robert Browning and Elizabeth Barrett Browning (Քերթող Ամոլի մը Հարիւրամեակը, Ռոբերտ Բրաւնինգի Ծննդեան Հարիւրամեակը եւ Եղիսաբէթ Բառռէտ-Բրաւնինգ), Scant, Ghalatia 1912 - (in Armenian)
- Léon Gurekian, L'Armenia nell'anima italiana, C.Colombo, Roma 1919 - (in Italian)
- Léon Gurekian, Le Responsable - Allégorie historique dans le Règne Animal, Jouve & C.ie Éditeurs, Paris 1919 - (in French)
- Léon Gurekian, The two-thousandth of Virgil (Վիրգիլեան երկհազարամեակը), San Lazzaro, Venezia 1931 - (in Armenian)
- Léon Gurekian, Primo Centenario della Fondazione del Collegio Armeno Moorat-Raphaël, Venezia (1836/1936), G.Fabris, Venezia 1936 - (in Italian)
- Léon Gurekian, Kars e Ardahan - Historical Documentation and National Rights (Կարս եւ Արտահան - Պատմական Հաւաստիք եւ Հայրենաւանդ Իրաւունք), S.Lazzaro, Venezia 1949 - (in Armenian)

== Bibliography ==
- Unione degli Studenti Armeni d'Italia, Indipendenza Armena, celebrata in Asolo, 20 agosto 1920, Tipografia del Seminario, Padova 1921
- Armen Gurekian, Léon Gurekian architetto, Asolo 2010
- Agop Manoukian, Presenza Armena in Italia, 1915-2000, Guerrini e Associati, Milano 2014
- Prando Prandi, La mia Asolo, Duck Edizioni, Castelfranco Veneto 2014, ISBN 9788889562260

== Exhibitions ==
- National Museum-Institute of Architecture of Armenia - Yerevan (Armenia), Léon Gurekian architect, 15 Mars - 15 May 2015
- Vanadzor (Armenia), Léon Gurekian architect, 3 October - 20 December 2015
