= Ohanian =

Ohanyan or Ohanian (Armenian: Օհանյան, Classical Armenian orthography: Օհանեան) is a common Armenian surname.

== Ohanian ==
- Alexis Ohanian (born 1983), American internet entrepreneur, activist and investor and co-founder of the social news website Reddit and more recently the husband of American female tennis player Serena Williams
- Armen Ohanian (1887–1976), Armenian dancer, actress, writer, and translator
- Mike Connors (born Krekor Ohanian; 1925–2017), American actor best known for playing Joe Mannix
- Lee E. Ohanian (born 1957), macroeconomist and university lecturer
- Melik Ohanian (born 1969), French contemporary artist
- Ovanes Ohanian (1896–1960), Armenian-Iranian filmmaker, inventor, founder, doctor, scientist
- Raffi Ohanian (born 1989), Armenian singer, winner of 2009–2010 season of Hay Superstar
- Sev Ohanian (born 1987), American film producer and screenwriter
- Vartine Ohanian (born 1984), Lebanese politician of Armenian descent

== Ohanyan ==
- Emin Ohanyan (born 2006), Armenian chess grandmaster
- Seyran Ohanyan (born 1962), Armenian politician and minister

== See also ==
- Mike Connors (1925–2017), real name Krekor Ohanian, American actor best known for playing detective Joe Mannix in the TV series Mannix
