= Hovhannes Hovhannisyan (YSU) =

Armenian politician

- Հովհաննես Հովհաննիսյան
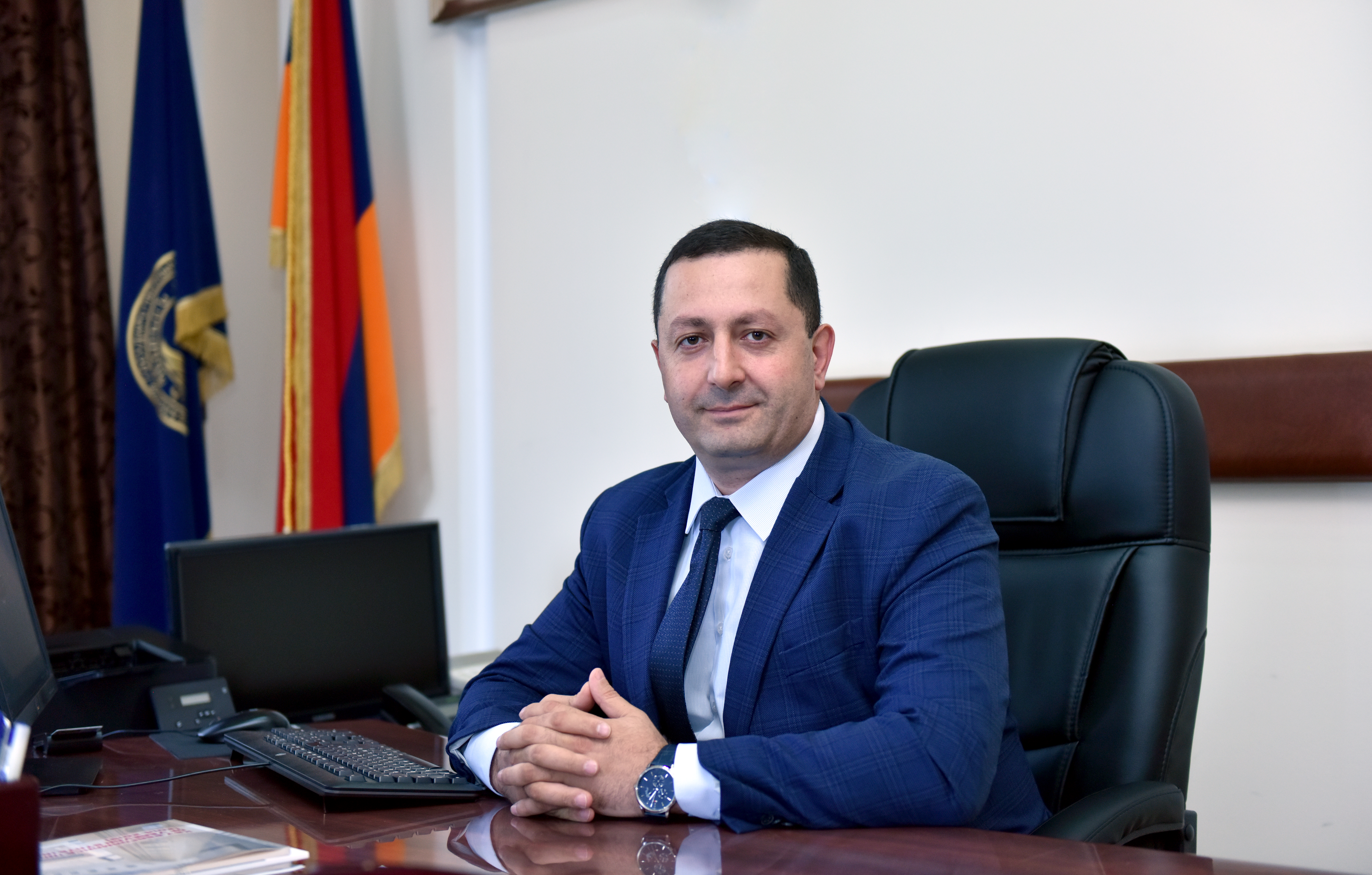

Personal details
- Born: 5 March 1980 (age 46) Armenia SSR, Soviet Union

Hovhannes Hovhannisyan (Armenian: Հովհաննես Հովհաննիսյան; born 5 March 1980), is the rector of Yerevan State University, a theologian, doctor of historical sciences, and associate professor. He was also a member of the Armenian National Assembly
