= Hovhannes Setian =

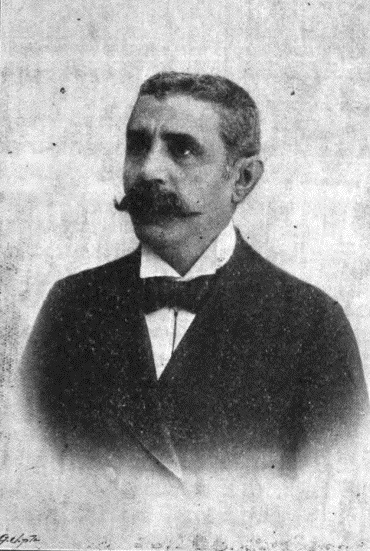
- Born: 1853; Constantinople
- Died: 1930 (aged 76–77); Cairo
- Occupations: Writer, poet, and teacher.
- Writing career
- Language: Armenian
- Movement: Romanticism

Hovhannes Setian (Armenian: Յովհաննէս ՍԷթեան, 1853 Constantinople, Ottoman Empire - 1930 Cairo, Egypt), was an Armenian short story writer, poet, and teacher.

Setian wrote many volumes of poetry, including Գրական զբօսանք (Literary Leisure, 1882), Յուզման ժամեր (Hours of Emotion, 1888), Բլուրն ի վեր (Up the Hill, 1896), and Տարագրին քնարը (The Lyre of an Emigre, 1912). His short stories and prose writing, collected in a volume called Արշալոյսէն վերջալոյսի (From Dawn till Dusk, 1912), were published in Cairo.
