= Heraclian revolt =

Heraclian rebellion: 608, son seizes Constantinople, establishes dynasty, 610

Heraclian revolt against Phocas
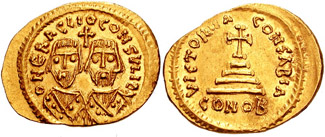
- Gold solidus of Heraclius and his father in consular robes, struck during their revolt against Phocas
Date	608 – 3 October 610
Location	Egypt, Cyrenaica, Sicily, Crete, Thessalonica, Constantinople
Result	Heraclian victory: The end of Justinian dynasty rule in Constantinople

Belligerents
Exarchate of Africa under Heraclius the Elder: Mauri; The Greens of Alexandria; The Greens of Constantinople (from October 610)	Byzantines loyal to Phocas: The Blues of Constantinople; The Blues of Alexandria (eventually switched sides); The Greens of Constantinople (until October 610)

Commanders and leaders
Heraclius the Elder; Heraclius the Younger; Nicetas; Bonakis (executed); Priscus (since October 610); Bonus?; Leontius (Prefect of Mareotis) (executed); Theodore (former Prefect of Alexandria) (executed); Sons of Menas (former Governor of Alexandria); Plato (executed); Kudis (executed); Bishop Theodore of Nikiu (executed); Unnamed chancellor of Nikiu (DOW)	Emperor Phocas (executed); Domentziolus (magister officiorum) (executed); Priscus (Count of the Excubitors) (until October 610); Bonosus; John (Governor of Alexandria); Paul (Prefect of Samnud); Cosmas son of Samuel; Christodora

Strength
Uncertain	

The Exarch of Africa Heraclius the Elder and his namesake son Heraclius the Younger began a rebellion against the Byzantine emperor Phocas in 608. In October 610, Heraclius the Younger reached Constantinople, executed Phocas, and was proclaimed as emperor, establishing the Heraclian dynasty of the Byzantine Empire.

== Background ==
Various reasons may have contributed to the beginning of this rebellion, such as the atmosphere of terror and fear of purges in Phocas' military regime, avenging the death of Emperor Maurice in 602, personal ambitions of the Heraclii, the damaged reputation of Phocas. These were coupled with calculations in favor of the revolt, such as the distance of the Exarchate of Africa from Phocas in Constantinople, and the fact that Constantinople was relying on the grain and revenues from the Exarchate. The news of the Sasanian ruler Khosrow II's large-scale mobilization of forces to invade the eastern Byzantine territories, also ostensibly to overthrow Phocas and avenge Maurice's death, made the situation more favorable for this revolt in the west.

== The rebellion ==
Heraclius the Elder first made himself and his son hypatos, thus laying claim on the supreme power. The rebels attacked Egypt and Cyrenaica via land, while a naval assault was launched from North Africa against Constantinople, possibly via Sicily and Italy. The rebellion received support in most of Egypt and the central Mediterranean.

== Aftermath ==
A revolt against the Heraclius' rule by Comentiolus, the brother of Phocas, was defeated after the assassination of the latter by patricius Justin in late 610 or 611.

Heraclius the Elder died shortly after the success of the revolt.

== Sources ==
- Kaegi, Walter E. (2003). Heraclius, Emperor of Byzantium. Cambridge University Press. ISBN 9780521814591.
