= Domentziolus =

Domentziolus or Domnitziolus may refer to:

- Domentziolus (brother of Phocas), brother of Byzantine Emperor Phocas and magister officiorum
- Domentziolus (nephew of Phocas), nephew of Byzantine Emperor Phocas, curopalates and general

== See also ==
- Domentzia
