= Leontia =

Roman empress from 602 to 610

- Augusta
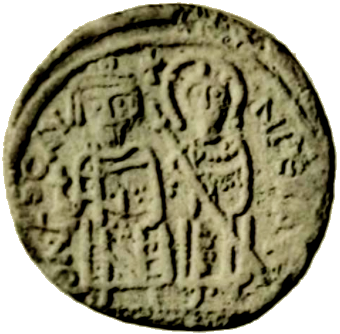
- Leontia (right) on a coin minted under her husband Phocas (left)

Empress consort of the Eastern Roman Empire
- Tenure: 602–610
- Spouse: Phocas
- Issue: Domentzia

Leontia (Greek: Λεοντία, romanized: Leontía, fl. 610) was an empress of the Eastern Roman Empire as the wife of Phocas.

== Empress ==
Maurice reigned in the Byzantine Empire from 582 to 602. When he decreed that the Byzantine army was to spend the winter of 602/603 on the northern bank of the Danube, the exhausted troops instead mutinied against their emperor. Phocas would emerge as the leader of the mutinous army during its march to Constantinople. Maurice also faced citywide rioting within the capital, and fled the city prior to the arrival of Phocas and his troops.

The Chronicon Paschale gives the chronological account of the rise of Phocas and Leontia to the throne. On 23 November 602, Phocas was crowned emperor by his troops outside the capital. On 25 November, Phocas entered Constantinople and was accepted as emperor by the general populace. He proclaimed chariot races in honor of his elevation and had Leontia escorted to the city as his new Empress. They had already been married for some time.

According to the chronicle of Theophanes the Confessor, Leontia was officially crowned an Augusta on 27 November. According to the history of Theophylact Simocatta, the new imperial couple led a procession through the city as per custom. The festive occasion was marked with renewed conflicts between the Blues and Greens, the two major chariot racing clubs. The Blues questioned the legitimacy of the new Emperor by reminding him that Maurice was still alive. Phocas reacted by ordering the execution of Maurice and his sons, which took place before the end of the day.

"The tyrant (Phocas) also had a wife whose name was Leontia; he placed a royal crown on her. Since it is customary for emperors to proclaim their consorts with processions as well, the tyrant openly honoured the custom and decided to lead the queen Leontia in triumph. On this day then, there was a conflict between the factions about their station, since they contested the arrangement of places: for the Greens wanted to take up station in the Ampelion, as it is called (this is a forecourt of the emperor's dwelling), and to serenade the queen with the customary applause, but the Blue faction objected, for they regarded this as contrary to custom and alien. Accordingly, since very great commotion arose, the tyrant sent in Alexander to quell the strife of the disputants".

The only known child of Leontia and Phocas was their daughter Domentzia. She was reportedly named after her paternal grandmother. She was married to Priscus, who served as Comes excubitorum (Commander of the Excubitors). Theophanes places the marriage in 607. The Chronicles of John of Antioch report this celebration to have initiated hostility between Phocas and his son-in-law. The chariot racing factions honored the occasion by placing images of Phocas, Leontia, Domentzia, and Priscus in the Hippodrome of Constantinople. The images of the reigning imperial couple belonged there by tradition. The latter two images implied that Priscus was the heir or co-emperor of Phocas. Phocas was enraged at the implication and ordered the depictions of his daughter and son-in-law to be destroyed. The incident supposedly caused Priscus to turn against his father-in-law.

== Deposition ==
Phocas was deposed and executed by Heraclius in October, 610. His brothers Domentziolus and Comentiolus were also executed. Whether Leontia was also executed is unknown.

Royal titles
Preceded by Constantina	Byzantine Empress consort 602–610	Succeeded by Eudokia
