= Excubitor =

Excubitor may refer to:

- Excubitors, imperial guards of the early Byzantine emperors
- Lanius excubitor, a bird species known as great grey shrike
- 8591 Excubitor, a main-belt asteroid
