= Bonakis =

Bonakis (died 609) was a Byzantine military commander, active in Cyrenaica (Libya) and Egypt. His name is occasionally rendered "Konakis". He joined the revolt of Heraclius against the emperor Phocas (r. 602-610) and was killed in the subsequent conflict. The main source about him is John of Nikiû, the relevant text only surviving in Ethiopian translation.

== Biography ==
Bonakis is first mentioned in 609. He was sent by Heraclius to the Pentapolis of Cyrenaica, leading an army consisting of 3,000 Roman (Byzantine) troops and an unknown number of Berbers. His forces joined those of Nicetas. Bonakis, Nicetas and Leontius joined forces to capture the town of Kabsain/Kabsen. John of Nikiû reports: "Heraclius, who distributed large sums of money among the Berbers of Tripolis and Pentapolis, and thereby prevailed on them to help him in the war. Next he summoned the captain of his forces, named Bonakis, with 3,000 men, and a large number of Berbers, and dispatched them to Pentapolis to wait for him there. And he sent likewise Nicetas, the son of Gregory, with large subsidies to the prefect Leontius, who had been appointed to the province of Mareotis by Phocas ... And Bonakis, the chief (captain) of Heraclius, (set out) and he saw Nicetas in Pentapolis as Heraclius had commanded. And he indeed had received troops from Leontius, who had been sent to the province of the Mareotis, and he had proceeded towards Nubia in Africa (?). Now the prefect Leontius had come to terms with them. And when they had met the garrison of the city of Kabsen, they entered but did no violence to the garrison. And they set free all the prisoners that they might join them in the war. And before they entered, they had prevailed on the inhabitants of the city to precede them (and) stir up a tumult on the river, named Pidrakon, that is, the Dragon, which flows close to the great city of Alexandria on the west."

Their combined forces marched towards Alexandria next. They were able to defeat the forces loyal to Phocas, kill their unnamed commander and capture the city. The narrative continues: "And when they had entered, they found the Balalun, the governor of Alexandria, with a large force of Egyptians arrayed with weapons of war. And they said to him : 'Hearken to our words and flee from us and preserve thy dignity, and remain neutral till thou seest the side which is victorious; and no calamity shall befall thee, and subsequently thou shalt become the Administrator of Egypt; for behold the days of Phocas are at an end.' But he refused to comply with this proposal and said: 'We will fight for the emperor unto death.' And when they engaged [in battle] they slew this misguided man, and cut off his head, and suspending it on a lance they carried it into the city. And not only none could withstand them, but many joined their ranks."

Bonakis was able to assemble his troops in Alexandria and secure control of the fleet at the nearby island of Pharos. He took control of Lower Egypt for Heraclius, with little further opposition. "And he [Bonakis] sent for his own troops and soldiers, and he sent likewise to Pharos, and had the soldiers who were in the fleet arrested and kept under a close guard. And information was subsequently brought to Bonosus in the city of Caesarea in Palestine that (the rebels) had captured the city of Alexandria and slain the Apulon, and that the inhabitants of that city hated him and were attached to Heraclius. Now previously to the arrival of Bonosus in Egypt, Bonakis met with no reverse, but gained the mastery over all the prefects in Egypt. ... And all the people rejoiced because of the revolt against Phocas. And all the inhabitants of Nakius and the bishop Theodore and all the cities of Egypt joined the revolt. But Paul the prefect of the city of Samnud alone did not join it. He was one of the prefects appointed by Phocas, and he was beloved by all the inhabitants of the city."

The arrival of general Bonosus, at the head of forces loyal to Phocas, caused Bonakis to retreat from Alexandria. He first retreated towards Nikiû. He then chose to attack Bonosus and Paul in the vicinity of Manuf (a local fortress). Bonakis lost the battle. He was captured by his enemies and killed. While this was a setback for Heraclius' revolt, said revolt continued until the deposition of Phocas in 610. John concludes: "They had heard news of Bonosus to the effect that he had arrived at the city of Bikuran. And when the party of Plato heard this news, they sent a dispatch to Bonakis in Alexandria to this effect : 'Hasten hither with thy forces; for Bonosus has arrived in the city of Farma.' And when Bonakis had reached Nakius, Bonosus likewise had already arrived at the city of Athrib, where he found Marcian's troops ready for war. Christodora also, the sister of Aillus (sic), and the troops of Cosmas the son of Samuel (were already there) by land. And he marched to the small branch of the river which proceeds from the main branch, and met with the prefect Paul and his troops. Then Bonakis came to attack Bonosus, and they engaged on the east of the city of Manuf. And in the engagement the forces of Cosmas the son of Samuel prevailed and drove those of Bonakis into the river, and they took Bonakis prisoner and slew him. And Leontius the general and Kudis they put to the sword, and they surrounded a large body of troops, and took them prisoners and threw them into chains. And when Plato and Theodore saw that Bonakis and his men had been slain, they fled to a convent and concealed themselves."

== Sources ==
- Charles, Robert H., ed. (2007) [1916]. The Chronicle of John, Bishop of Nikiu: Translated from Zotenberg's Ethiopic Text. Merchantville, NJ: Evolution Publishing. ISBN 9781889758879.
- Martindale, John R., ed. (1992). "Bonakis". The Prosopography of the Later Roman Empire: Volume III, AD 527–641. Cambridge: Cambridge University Press. p. 237. ISBN 0-521-20160-8.
