= Alexander (taxiarch) =

Alexander was a Byzantine military officer, active in the reign of Maurice. He is styled a taxiarch (Greek: ταξίαρχος) in the accounts of Theophylact Simocatta. He is known for his part in campaigns against the Sclaveni.

== Biography ==
Alexander is styled a taxiarch (Greek: ταξίαρχος) in the accounts of Theophylact Simocatta. This might be an attempt to translate a Latin title. He is unlikely to have served as a magister militum, always mentioned serving under other commanders. He might have been a comes rei militaris or a dux. In either case, Alexander was stationed in Thrace.

He is first mentioned in 593, serving under Priscus. Alexander was at that time tasked with leading a scouting party. He and his men crossed the river Helibakion (Ialomiţa River) in search of a group of Slavic raiders. The raiders attempted to escape through the local marshes, disorienting the Byzantines. Alexander attempted to set fire to the woods covering the rebels. But the material was too wet to catch fire. At that point, one of the raiders defected to Alexander's side. He was a Gepid who had briefly joined the Slavs, but apparently was not committed to their cause. He led Alexander to the hideout of his former allies. They were easily captured.

Alexander returned to Priscus' camp with the captives and valuable information. The raiders were spies employed by Musokios. The latter had just been informed of the defeat of Ardagast and had yet to react to it. Priscus and the defector started working on a trap to capture Musokios and his forces. In said plan, Alexander was assigned to lead an advance force.

Late one night, Alexander and two hundred soldiers managed to take positions near the banks of the river Paspirion. They went unnoticed and lay in ambush. The following night, they attacked the boatmen of Musokios, who were reportedly drunk and asleep at the time. They were easily slaughtered, and Alexander captured the entire fleet of the Slavs. The boats were used to transport Priscus and the main force of the army, an estimated 3,000 men. Under the cover of the night, the entire force attacked the Slavic camp. Musokios was captured alive, while most of his men were slaughtered.

In 594, Alexander served under the curopalates Peter. Alexander led a force of 1,000 cavalrymen against 600 Slavs. The enemies had recently plundered a number of cities in Moesia and were slowed down by the need to transport their loot. The Slavs reacted swiftly to Alexander's approach. They first executed all the male prisoners from Moesia who were able to use weapons. They then used their wagons as barricades, placing the female captives and the children in the middle. The warriors themselves "stood on the carts, brandishing their javelins".

The Byzantine cavalrymen could not approach their enemies without exposing their horses to danger, so Alexander ordered them to dismount and fight as infantry. The battle was decided when an unnamed Byzantine soldier managed to capture one of the wagons. The defense of the Slavs collapsed, though they took the time to kill the rest of their captives first. They were then killed by the charging Byzantines. Following this victory, there is no further mention of Alexander.

== Sources ==
- Bury, John Bagnell (1889), A History of the Later Roman Empire from Arcadius to Irene, Vol. II, MacMillan & Co., ISBN 1-60520-405-6
- Martindale, John R., ed. (1992). The Prosopography of the Later Roman Empire: Volume III, AD 527–641. Cambridge: Cambridge University Press. ISBN 0-521-20160-8.
