= Domentzia =

Wikipedia set index article

Domentzia (Greek: Δομεντζία) was a name shared by the mother of the Byzantine emperor Phocas (r. 602–610), and a daughter of the same emperor, likely named after her paternal grandmother.

== Name ==
The mother is only named by John of Antioch, who renders her name in Greek as "Dysmenziane" (Δυσμενζιανή). All other occurrences of the name refer to the daughter. The more familiar form "Domentzia" (Δομεντζία) is given by Theophanes the Confessor. Anastasius Bibliothecarius, who translated the work of Theophanes to Latin, renders the name "Domnentzia". The later historian Joannes Zonaras gives the name as "Domnentia" (Δομνεντία), while Nikephoros Kallistos Xanthopoulos gives her name as "Dysmenziane", indicating that both women used the same name.

== Mother of Phocas ==
Phocas and his family were likely of Thraco-Roman origin. The husband of the elder Domentzia is unknown. She had three known sons: Phocas, Comentiolus and Domentziolus. The latter seems to have been magister officiorum by 610. A grandson, also named Domentziolus, was granted the title of curopalates on the ascension of Phocas to the throne in 602.

== Daughter of Phocas ==
The younger Domentzia was a daughter of Phocas and Leontia. In 607, she married the general Priscus, who served as comes excubitorum, commander of the Excubitors bodyguard. As she was the only known child of the Emperor, the marriage effectively made Priscus an heir presumptive to the throne. Her husband fell into disfavour however when the citizenry of Constantinople began erecting statues in their honour.

Her marriage took place in the palace of Marina, named after its original owner, a daughter of Arcadius and Aelia Eudoxia. A chariot racing event was arranged to be held in the Hippodrome of Constantinople, in honor of the newlyweds. The leaders of the Blues (Vénetoi) and the Greens (Prásinoi) racing factions (demoi) decided to honor the occasion by erecting statues of the imperial family. Thus they placed images of Phocas, Leontia, Domentzia, and Priscus in the Hippodrome. The images of the reigning imperial couple belonged there by tradition, but the latter two implied that Priscus was the heir or co-emperor of Phocas. Phocas was enraged at the implication and ordered the depictions of his daughter and son-in-law to be destroyed.

Phocas further treated the matter as an attempted coup d'état, demanding further investigation of the matter, arresting the demarchs responsible with accusations of treason. While their lives may have been spared due to popular demand, Phocas likely viewed Priscus himself as the culprit, and seems to have started viewing his son-in-law as a potential rival. By alienating Priscus however, Phocas undermined his own hold on the throne. By 608, John of Antioch reports Priscus initiating contact with Heraclius the Elder, the Exarch of Africa, and instigating the revolt that would eventually remove Phocas from power.

== Sources ==
- Bury, John Bagnell (2009) [1889]. History of the Later Roman Empire from Arcadius to Irene. Vol. II. Cosimo, Inc. ISBN 978-1-60520-405-5.
- Martindale, John R., ed. (1992). The Prosopography of the Later Roman Empire: Volume III, AD 527–641. Cambridge: Cambridge University Press. ISBN 0-521-20160-8.
- Settipani, Christian (2006). Continuité des élites à Byzance durant les siècles obscurs. Les princes caucasiens et l'Empire du VIe au IXe siècle Continuité des élites à Byzance durant les siècles obscurs (in French).
