= Domentziolus (nephew of Phocas) =

Byzantine general

- Relatives: Emperor Phocas (uncle), Comentiolus (uncle), Domentziolus (?father/uncle)
- Military career
- Allegiance: East Roman Empire
- Branch: East Roman army
- Rank: magister militum per Orientem
- Conflicts: Byzantine-Sassanid War of 602–628

Domentziolus (Greek: Δομεντζίολος) or Domnitziolus (Greek: Δομνιτζίολος) was a nephew of the Byzantine emperor Phocas (r. 602–610), appointed curopalates and general in the East during his uncle's reign. He was one of the senior Byzantine military leaders during the opening stages of the Byzantine–Sassanid War of 602–628. His defeats opened the way for the fall of Mesopotamia and Armenia and the invasion of Anatolia by the Persians. In 610, Phocas was overthrown by Heraclius, and Domentziolus was captured but escaped serious harm.

== Biography ==
=== Background ===
The exact parentage of Domentziolus is unclear: Phocas had two known brothers, Comentiolus and another also named Domentziolus, who has sometimes been suggested as the younger Domentziolus's father. Shortly after the accession of Phocas, in 603, the younger Domentziolus was raised to the titles of vir gloriosissimus, patricius and curopalates.

=== General in the East ===
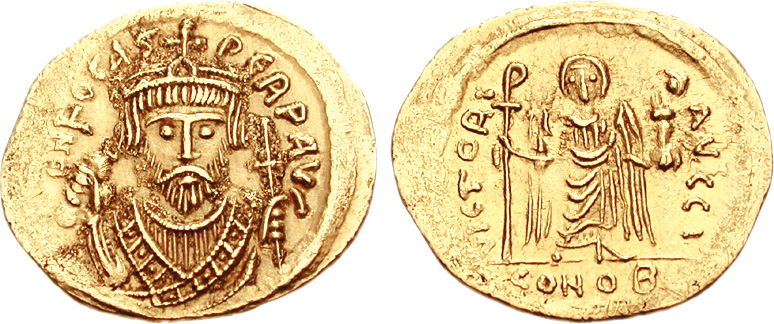
Gold solidus of Emperor Phocas (r. 602–610).

Domentziolus, however, is better known as a general in the Byzantine-Sassanid War of 602–628. Phocas's elevation to the throne had been recognized by neither the Sassanid Persian shah Khosrau II, nor by Narses, the Byzantine governor of the province of Mesopotamia. The two had allied against Phocas, with Narses gathering his forces in Edessa, while waiting for Sassanid reinforcements. In 604, Phocas appointed Domentziolus as magister militum per Orientem and sent him against the Persians. His predecessors Germanus and Leontius had both been defeated, the former killed in battle and the latter recalled and imprisoned by Phocas.

According to the Life of St. Theodore of Syceon, Domentziolus fell into a Persian ambush but was able to escape. In 604/605, he also surrounded Narses and his troops, and persuaded him to surrender on guarantees of his personal safety. Phocas, nonetheless, had Narses executed by burning him alive. At about the same time, Dara, an important Byzantine city in Mesopotamia, fell to the Persians. Khosrau was encouraged to cease simply raiding the Byzantine provinces, instead attempting to conquer them. In 607, he launched concurrent invasions on Mesopotamia and Armenia.

With the Byzantine forces at the Persian front having already suffered heavy casualties in previous confrontations, Domentziolus was unable to oppose the Sassanid raids during 605. There was also little chance of further reinforcements. Phocas had concluded peace treaties with the Lombards and Avars in an attempt to secure control of his provinces in the Italian Peninsula and the Balkans. He had already stripped the Balkans of most of their military forces, reassigning them to the Persian front. But this policy had backfired with the undermanned Balkans facing a Slavic invasion, notably endangering Thessalonica.

While one Persian force, under Shahrbaraz, was able to secure control of Amida, Domentziolus concentrated his efforts on a second one under Shahin Vahmanzadegan. He was heavily defeated in the vicinity of Theodosiopolis (modern Erzurum), and the Persians were able to recover most of Persarmenia, which had been ceded to Byzantium in 591. In 608, Shahrbaraz and Shahin continued their respective efforts to conquer Mesopotamia and Armenia.

By 609, the Sassanid conquest of Mesopotamia and Armenia was mostly complete. Shahin next led an invasion of Cappadocia. Domentziolus's forces were bypassed, while another kinsman of Phocas, called Sergius, attempted to face the invaders and was killed in combat. Sergius was possibly magister militum per Armeniam. Shahin managed to capture Caesarea Mazaca (modern Kayseri), the main city of the area. His forces were then able to make raids "all the way to Chalcedon" in Bithynia, in the vicinity of Constantinople.

=== Downfall of the regime ===
Meanwhile, another front had opened. The Exarchate of Africa under Heraclius the Elder had revolted against Phocas. The situation in 609–610 was quickly becoming dire for Domentziolus and all Phocas loyalists. Their defense against the Sassanids had failed. There were Persian forces in Mesopotamia, Armenia, Syria and the Anatolian provinces. Rebel Byzantine forces held Africa and Egypt. Slavs were occupying northern Illyricum. In Thessalonica and various towns of Anatolia and Syria, the Blues and Greens were settling their differences with open conflict. In areas of Syria, the Jews were revolting and lynching Christians. Even in Constantinople, the crowds taunted Phocas for his love of liquor, implying alcoholism.

In 610, Shahrbaraz was approaching Antioch. But the Persian front was not the immediate threat: the rebels of Africa were. Having secured control of Egypt, they proceeded to invade Syria and Cyprus while a large fleet under Heraclius the Younger, a son of the exarch, set sail for Constantinople. Supporters from Sicily, Crete and Thessalonica were joining his campaign. The rebels reached Constantinople in October 610. The only forces available to Phocas to defend the city were the Excubitors of his bodyguard and the irregular forces of the Blues and Greens, the city's racing factions. Priscus, the commander of the Excubitors, chose the moment to reveal his allegiance to Heraclius, having apparently secretly conspired for some time. The Greens also changed sides. Constantinople fell with relative ease.

Heraclius the Younger became the new Byzantine emperor. Phocas was executed, along with several of his kinsmen and loyalists. Domentziolus too was sentenced to death, but was pardoned and released after the intercession of Theodore of Syceon. Nothing further is known of him after that.

=== Family ===
According to the hagiography of Theodore of Syceon, Domentziolus was married to a lady named Irene, and had three sons. Elizabeth Dawes summarizes the tale given as following: "Domnitziolus, patrician and curopalates, asks Theodore to visit him in Arcadianae. His wife Eirene has no children: the saint blesses her and promises her three children - and they will be boys. All the male and female slaves of the household are brought to Theodore for his blessing. A slave girl had long been ill, troubled by a hidden demon. He beats on her breast and the demon declares itself. Then the Saint laying her on the ground Put his foot on her neck, turned his eyes to the east and uttered a silent prayer. At the end of his prayer he recited aloud the doxology of the Holy Trinity. For some time the slave girl remained speechless and then was completely cured. Later Eirene gave birth to three sons, as the Saint had prophesied. The conception of her first son immediately followed the Saint's prayer. Emperor and Patriarch say farewell to Theodore and he returns to his monastery." Since Theodore died by 613, the tale would have to occur prior to this date.
