= Joannicius the Great =

Christian saint and theologian

Saint Joannicius the Great
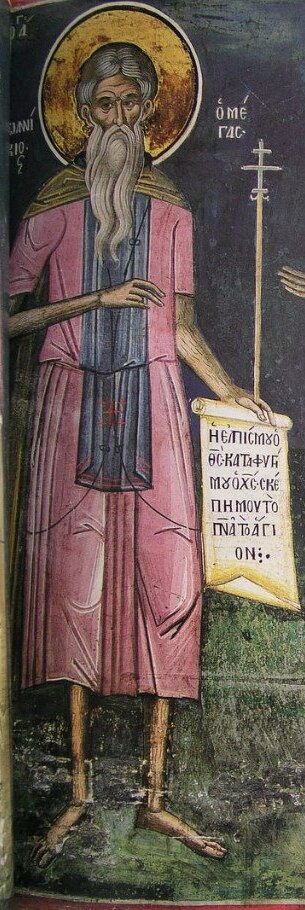
- Fresco from Dionysiou Monastery

Venerable
- Born: 762
- Died: 846
- Venerated in: Catholic Church, Eastern Orthodox Church, Anglican Communion
- Feast: November 4

Joannicius the Great or Ioannikios (Greek: Όσιος Ιωαννίκιος ο Μέγας; born 762, Bithynia - November 4, 846 in Antidium) was a Byzantine Christian saint, sage, theologian and prophet. Well known for his devoted asceticism and defense of icon veneration, Joannicius spent the majority of his life as a hermit on Mysian Olympus, near what is today Bursa, Turkey. Joannicius lived during the reign of Emperor Theophilos, a noted iconoclast, which contrasted with Joannicius's embrace of icon veneration. Icon veneration was later restored to the Byzantine Empire under the reign of Empress Theodora, a move that some devotees ascribe to Joannicius's influence and prophecies. Joannicius served in the Byzantine army in his early years before devoting his life to ascetic study and monastic contemplation. He is venerated with a feast day on November 4 in the Eastern Orthodox Church and Catholic Church (November 17 in the Old Calendar).

== Early life ==
In a similar fashion to many other Medieval Christian saints, there are nearly no primary sources about Joannicus that are not hagiographical in nature. Byzantine scholars have therefore referred primarily to two hagiographies as the fundamental sources for Joannicius's life.

According to his hagiography, Joannicius was born in 762 (or 754) to Myritzikios and Anastaso, of the Boïlas family. He is known to have had at least one sister. His family was poor, and possibly of an iconoclast persuasion.

Joannicius was spiritual from a young age, and often sought solitude in order to pray and contemplate. When Joannicius reached young adulthood (c. 772/3), he was drafted into the elite regiment of the Excubitors by Leo IV. He served there until 792, distinguishing himself by saving Emperor Constantine VI (or an officer, according to another variant) from being captured at the Battle of Marcellae. Following Marcellae, he left the army—apparently deserting—and joined the Antidion Monastery. Although he wished to immediately retreat to the wilderness, he remained at the monastery for two years, during which time he memorized the Psalms by heart. After two years, he escaped to Mysian Olympus, where he remained as a hermit for the remainder of his life.

== Life as an ascetic ==
According to the hagiographies, Joannicius spent the rest of his life as an ascetic on Mysian Olympus, with years dedicated to solitude, study, and prayer. Joannicius spent most of his time reciting the psalms and meditating on the life of Jesus, but the hagiographies also ascribe some miracles and prophecies to him. Among the many stories related in the hagiographical sources, Joannicius is attributed with saving the island of Thasos from snakes, leading Greek captives out of prison, and saving a nun from breaking her vow. In one of the more famous stories, Joannicius found a nun near Mysian Olympus running away from her cloister, intending to marry. Joannicius intervened, allegedly taking on all the pains of her sin and allowing her to remain a devout nun. Joannicius was allegedly so close to God and so devoted to solitude, he was capable of making himself invisible.

Outside of the miraculous narratives, Joannicius is also given some importance in Byzantine history, particularly regarding icon veneration. Although Joannicius was born into an iconoclastic family, he later became a devout believer in icon veneration. During the reign of the iconoclast Theophilos, Joannicius prophesied that the Byzantine church would eventually re-embrace icon veneration, a prophecy that is interpreted by devotees to have been fulfilled during the reign of Theodora when she restored icon veneration to the Orthodox Church. Joannicius is also credited with blessing a young Photios I, who would become a widely venerated Patriarch of Constantinople.

== Death and legacy ==
According to most sources, Joannicius died in solitude on November 3 or 4, 846. He was buried at the Antidion Monastery. He is venerated as a saint by the Roman Catholic Church, the Eastern Orthodox Church, and the Anglican Communion. A short prayer that is generally attributed to Joannicius is occasionally said after readings of the Psalms in church services.

"My hope is the Father, my refuge is the Son, my shelter is the Holy Spirit. O Holy Trinity, Glory to You." - Prayer of St. Joannicius.

== Additional resources ==
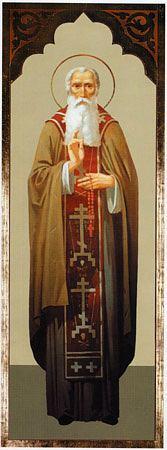
Eastern Orthodox icon of Saint Joannicius the Great

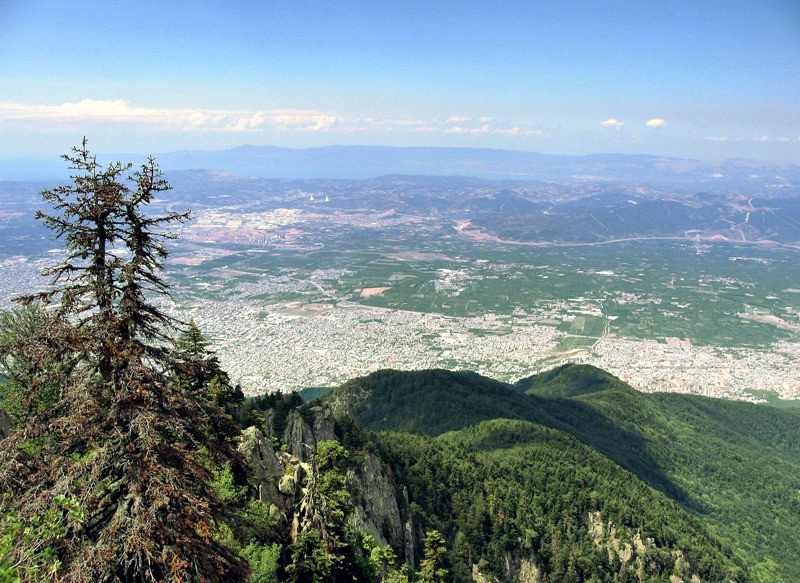
Mount of Mysian Olympus (Uludağ in Turkey, with view over Bursa), where Saint Joannicius withdrew and accomplished his ascetic feats as a hermit. Until 1930s, the mountain was known as Keşiş Dağı, "Mountain of Monks"
