= Ardagast =

Slavic chieftain

Ardagast(us)
- Years active: 593/594

Ardagast or Radogost (Ancient Greek: Ἀρδάγαστος Ardagastos; Cyrillic: Ардагаст; fl. 584–597) was a 6th-century Sclaveni brigadier (chieftain), alongside Peiragastus/Peragastus (594), under rex Musokios, mentioned by Theophylact Simocatta.

== Etymology ==
The name may derive from Slavic rada – "council" or "rad" – "eager" and gostiti or hostit – "to host", meaning "the one who hosts the council" or "eager to host – hospitable". It could have been a personal name, or an acquired title designating the leader or chieftain of a council, assembly, or veche. Ardagast is an old Slavic unmetathised form.

== Military campaigns ==
The raid in Thrace in 585 prompted Emperor Maurice to deal with the Slavs – sending an army under commander-in-chief Priscus and infantry commander Gentzon to cross the Danube at Dorostolon (present-day Silistra) and to carry out a surprise attack on the Slavs in their own territory (as the Slavs had long been pillaging the Byzantine Empire). The Byzantine army arrived at the Slavic camp at midnight, surprising the Slavs, who fled in confusion; Ardagast fell on a tree stump and was almost captured, but luckily he was near a river and eluded the attackers. Ardagast may have used a primitive snorkel, fashioned from a reed, to hide in the river for an extended period of time; this technique is mentioned in the Strategikon of Maurice.

Priscus sent his lieutenant Alexander across the Helibakion (Ialomiţa River) to find Slavs who were hiding in the woods and swamps, they failed to burn out the people hiding there, but a Gepid Christian who was associated with the Slavs deserted and revealed a secret passage. The Byzantine army then easily captured the Slavs, who according to the Gepid, were subjects of rex Musokios.
