= Constantine Opos (megas doux) =

Byzantine general and aristocrat

- Military career
- Allegiance: Byzantine Empire
- Rank: strategos, megas doux
- Conflicts: Battle of Dyrrhachium (1081), Byzantine–Seljuk Wars

Constantine Opos (Greek: Κωνσταντίνος Ὤπος) was a notable Byzantine general and aristocrat in the first half of the reign of Emperor Alexios I Komnenos (r. 1081–1118). He participated in the wars against the Normans and the Seljuk Turks, eventually reaching the rank of megas doux (commander-in-chief of the Byzantine navy).

== Biography ==
Constantine Opos first appears in the Alexiad in 1081, during Alexios's campaign against the Normans of Robert Guiscard, leading the tagma of the Exkoubitoi. The campaign ended in the Byzantine defeat at the Battle of Dyrrhachium on 18 October 1081, which effectively shattered the last remains of the old-established regiments of the middle Byzantine army. The Exkoubitoi are never heard from again; their remnants were probably disbanded, marking the end of this historic unit, which had been founded as an elite imperial bodyguard by Emperor Leo I the Thracian (r. 457–474).

In 1090, Opos was subordinate to the admiral Constantine Dalassenos during the siege of the island of Chios, held by the forces of the Turkish emir Tzachas of Smyrna. Hoping to prevent Tzachas from crossing over from the mainland with reinforcements and relieve the siege, Dalassenos sent Opos with part of the fleet to interdict the crossing of the Chios Strait. Opos indeed encountered Tzachas's fleet attempting to cross during night, but, according to the Alexiad, as the emir had had his ships chained together, Opos feared to engage them and retreated to the Byzantine camp.

In 1092, he was charged with retaking the town of Cyzicus on the Marmara Sea, after a previous Byzantine naval expedition under Alexander Euphorbenos had failed. Opos led his forces overland to Cyzicus, and successfully stormed the town. He then dispatched troops that took Poimanenon before marching to Apollonias. He laid siege to the city, but soon the Turkish emir, Elchanes, surrendered it and his family to him.

By 1094, when he is attested in the synod that condemned Leo of Chalcedon, Opos had risen to the dignity of protoproedros. From a seal we know that he later rose further to protonobelissimos, and in a manuscript that belonged to him, he is finally recorded as megas doux. Opos is last attested in 1097, during the First Crusade, when he was tasked with preventing the forces of a certain count, Raoul, from crossing the Bosporus, and even engaged in battle with the Crusaders.

== Sources ==
- Birkenmeier, John W. (2002). The Development of the Komnenian Army: 1081-1180. Boston, Massachusetts: Brill. ISBN 90-04-11710-5.
- Dawes, Elizabeth A., ed. (1928). The Alexiad. London: Routledge & Kegan Paul. Archived from the original on 2014-08-14.
- Haldon, John (1999). Warfare, State and Society in the Byzantine World, 565–1204. London: UCL Press. ISBN 1-85728-495-X.
- Skoulatos, Basile (1980). Les personnages byzantins de l'Alexiade: Analyse prosopographique et synthèse [The Byzantine Personalities of the Alexiad: Prosopographical Analysis and Synthesis] (in French). Louvain-la-Neuve and Louvain: Bureau du Recueil Collège Érasme and Éditions Nauwelaerts.
