= Musokios =

6th century Slavic ruler

- Title: Rex of the Sclaveni

Musokios was a 6th-century Sclaveni rex that ruled around 593, during Maurice's Balkan campaigns, mentioned by Theophylact Simocatta.

== Raid on Ardagast ==
Ardagast, a commander of Musokios, was sent and raided Thrace, which prompted Emperor Maurice to deal with the Sclaveni - sending an army with commander-in-chief Priscus and infantry commander Gentzon to cross the Danube at Dorostolon (present-day Silistra) and surprise attack the Slavs in their own territory (as the Slavs had long been pillaging the Byzantine Empire). In 593 the Army arrived at the Slavic camp at midnight, surprising the Slavs who fled in confusion, Ardagast fell on a tree stump and was almost captured, but luckily he was near a river and eluded the caption.

Priscus sent his lieutenant Alexander across the Helibakion (Ialomiţa River) to find Slavs who were hiding in the woods and swamps, they failed to burn out the people hiding, but a Gepid Christian who was associated with the Slavs deserted and showed a secret passage after which the army easily captured the Slavs, who according to the Gepid, subjects of rex Musokios (distant three days of marching).

== End ==
When lieutenant Alexander returned with the Gepid and captives, the Gepid received handsome presents and arranged a strategy to bring Musokios and his army into the hands of the Byzantines. The Gepid contacted Musokios and asked him to send a transport across the Paspirion river for the remaining army of Ardagast, Musokios assembled 150 monoxyles and 30 oarsmen which crossed the river. Meanwhile, Priscus approached the banks and met with the Gepid and arranged an ambush with 200 men in the guidance of Alexander (with additional 3,000 men crossing the river).

On the following night, the boatmen were heavily intoxicated of wine and fell asleep. The Gepid gave the signal and the Slav colony was slaughtered, with the boats taken into Byzantine possession and filled with 300 soldiers heading towards Musokios. A funeral ceremony of the brother of Musokios took place at the camp, with the people, as the boatsmen, being heavily intoxicated. Musokios was surprised and taken alive, a massacre lasted til the morning. Some Slavs escaped and managed to destroy a good part of the army led by Gentzon, as a result, Priscus hanged the negligent guards.
