= Demarchos =

Official title in antiquity

The dēmarchos (Greek: δήμαρχος, lit. 'archon of the deme'; plural δήμαρχοι, dēmarchoi), anglicized as Demarch, is a title historically given to officials related to civic administration. In ancient Athens the title was given to the elected chief magistrate of each of the demes of Attica. In later literature, the term was used as a translation of the Roman office of tribunus plebis. In the Byzantine Empire the dēmarchos was the leader of one of the racing factions (then known as "demes") of the Hippodrome of Constantinople. Largely concerned with ceremonial in the early centuries, from the 11th century the title was applied to various administrative positions in Constantinople, until the end of the empire. In modern usage, the term is used for the mayor of a municipality.

== Ancient Greece ==
=== Athens ===
In Classical Athens, the dēmarchos was the highest magistrate in each of the 139 demes (δήμοι, dēmoi, sing. δήμος, dēmos) that comprised Attica after the reforms of Cleisthenes. The office lasted for one year, and was elected from the members of the deme (the δημώται, dēmotai), initially by direct vote, but by the end of the 4th century, he was usually elected by lot. The dēmarchos of Piraeus was initially appointed by the polis (i.e., the Athenian city-state), as was that of Oropus; these too eventually came to be elected by lot from among the entire Athenian citizen body. In some demes, the office was eponymous, i.e. it was used for dating, along with the names of the eponymous archons of the entire polis of Athens.

The responsibilities of the dēmarchos were to convene and chair the local assembly, and supervise the execution of its resolutions, as well as their engraving in public view. Along with the treasurers he supervised the deme's landed properties and their rent, as well as expenditure; along with the priests he was responsible for religious festivals, sacrifices, or theatre performances. As chief magistrate he also possessed considerable judicial powers, including holding his outgoing predecessor to account, and chairing the assembly when it was functioning as a public court. In the event that the deme as a whole was involved in a court case, he was responsible for representing it before the Heliaia.

Occupying a crucial position at the interface between the deme and the Athenian polis, he was also charged with maintaining up to date the deme's register of citizens (ληξιαρχικόν γραμματεῖον, lēxiarchikon grammateion), which he kept sealed at his own residence, as well as registers of those citizens eligible for naval service as rowers in the triremes. It is unclear whether he was also responsible for maintaining registers of those eligible for hoplite service. He also had fiscal duties, supervising confiscations and maintaining the registers of confiscated property, as well as collecting (before 387/86 BC) the eisphora tax from property-owning citizens.

=== Other usage ===
The office is also attested in Chios in the 6th century BC, where the dēmarchos was appointed alongside the basileus, possibly charged with judicial matters, whereas in Eretria on Euboea the dēmarchos was responsible for religious affairs.

In Naples, originally a Greek colony in Italy, the dēmarchos was originally an important office, standing at the head of the polis. It is unclear whether it was held by a single person or a college of holders. The office survived into the Roman period, where it was reduced to a largely symbolic role supervising public religious acts and festivals. Its holders included the Roman emperors Titus (r. 79–81) and Hadrian (r. 117–138). The office survived at least until the time of Constantine the Great (r. 306–337).

Greek writers also commonly used the term to translate the Roman magistrature of tribunus plebis, probably influenced by the title's use in Naples and other Greek cities of the area. The term tribunicia potestas was thus rendered δημαρχικὴ ἐξουσία (dēmarchikē exousia).

== Byzantine usage ==
=== Background ===
In Late Antiquity, the term "demes" (dēmoi) came to be used for the associations responsible for the organization of games and chariot races. There were usually four, known by their colours as the Blues (Βένετοι, Venetoi), Greens (Πράσινοι, Prasinoi), Whites (Λευκοὶ, Leukoi), and Reds (Ῥούσιοι, Rhousioi). The Blues and Greens were the most important, with the Whites and Reds as their respective junior partners. In Late Antiquity, they were widespread across the Byzantine Empire, and even played an important political role, both as leading ceremonial acclamations to the emperor in the Hippodrome of Constantinople, and as organizing factors in urban riots in the empire's great cities, notably the Nika revolt in Constantinople. However, after the Muslim conquests and the crisis of the 7th century, the dēmoi were restricted to Constantinople and were reduced to a purely ceremonial role as integral parts of the administration: their personnel had court ranks, and were paid salaries by the praipositos.

According to the Klētorologion of 899, only the Blues and Greens survived, separated further into those "of the city" (πολιτικοὶ, politikoi), under a dēmarchos, and the "suburban" (περατικοὶ, peratikoi), under a dēmokratēs, a role which was entrusted to senior military officials: the Domestic of the Schools for the Blues, and the Domestic of the Excubitors for the Greens. All of these were grouped under the generic label of dēmokratai.

=== History and functions ===
The title of dēmarchos is first securely attested in 602. The 10th-century Patria of Constantinople refer to two dēmarchoi under Theodosius II (r. 408–450), but this is most likely an anachronism. In popular usage, they are sometimes called dioikētai (διοικηταὶ).

Their exact role is unclear: in view of their ceremonial role in later centuries, Alan Cameron suggested that they were claque conductors, whereas G. Manojlovic considered them as military commanders of a militia recruited by the dēmoi. By the mid-9th century, the dēmarchos was a government official, as attested in the Taktikon Uspensky and seals of office, holding the dignities such as hypatos or prōtospatharios in the court hierarchy. The Klētorologion records their staff of subaltern officials:

- a deputy (δευτερεύων, deutereuōn, lit. 'the second one')
- a secretary (χαρτουλάριος, chartoularios) and a notary (νοτάριος, notarios)
- a poet (ποιητής, poiētēs) and a composer (μελιστής, melistēs) for the acclamations during ceremonies
- a master (ἅρχων, archōn) and the 'first ones' (τὰ πρωτεῖα, ta prōteia), whose role is obscure
- a 'neighbourhood supervisor' (γειτονιάρχης, geitoniarchēs), whose exact duties are unclear
- the charioteers (ἡνίοχοι, hēniochoi), specifically the officials known as the faktionarios (φακτιονάριος) of the Blues and Greens and the mikropanitēs (μικροπανίτης) of the Whites and Reds
- the ordinary members (δημῶται, dēmōtai)

The actual personnel of the Hippodrome were not part of their staff. In the De ceremoniis of Emperor Constantine VII Porphyrogennetos, the ceremonies of promotion for the dēmarchoi are recorded, as well as for their subalterns.

In the 11th century, the dēmarchoi that appear in seals also hold offices in the administration, such as symponos and logariastēs. The continuity with their 9th–10th century forebears is unclear. The title survived into the Palaiologan period, charged with various administrative duties in Constantinople: according to a letter of Patriarch Athanasius I of Constantinople (1289–1293 and 1303–1309), two dēmarchoi were responsible for supervising the grain trade and bread production, while later in the 14th century the dēmarchoi administered the quarters (geitoniai) of the city. In the mid-14th century book of ceremonies of pseudo-Kodinos, the banners (φλάμουλα, phlamoula) of the dēmarchoi are mentioned as following behind those of all the other officials in processions.

The dēmarchoi served as military commanders during the Fall of Constantinople in 1453; pseudo-Sphrantzes relates that Constantine XI appointed Giustiniani Longo as a "demarchos and strategos" over 400 soldiers.

== Sources ==
- Bury, J. B.; Philotheus (1911). The Imperial Administrative System of the Ninth Century (With a Revised Text of the Kletorologion of Philotheos). London: Oxford University Press.
- Kazhdan, Alexander, ed. (1991). The Oxford Dictionary of Byzantium. Oxford and New York: Oxford University Press. ISBN 0-19-504652-8.
- Oikonomides, Nicolas (1972). Les listes de préséance byzantines des IXe et Xe siècles (in French). Paris: Editions du Centre National de la Recherche Scientifique.
- Rhodes, Peter J.; Tinnefeld, Franz (2008). "Demarchos". Brill's New Pauly. Brill Online. doi:10.1163/1574-9347_bnp_e314030.
- von Schoeffer, Valerian (1901). "Demarchoi". Realencyclopädie der Classischen Altertumswissenschaft. Band IV, Halbband 8, Corniscae–Demodoros. col. 2706–2712.
- Verpeaux, Jean, ed. (1966). Pseudo-Kodinos, Traité des Offices (in French). Centre National de la Recherche Scientifique.
