= Eastern Roman army =

395-7th century army

The Eastern Roman army refers to the army of the eastern section of the Roman Empire, from the empire's definitive split in 395 AD to the army's reorganization by themes after the permanent loss of Syria, Palestine and Egypt to the Arabs in the 7th century during the Byzantine-Arab Wars. The East Roman army was the continuation of the Late Roman army of the 4th century, until it gradually transformed into what is now called the Byzantine army from the 7th century onwards.

The East Roman army was a direct continuation of the eastern portion of the late Roman army as it existed before the final division of the empire. The East Roman army initially maintained the same basic organization as the late Roman army and its West Roman counterpart, but gradually underwent significant structural changes between the 5th and 7th centuries. Cavalry became more important, mobile field armies took on a more prominent role, and the border armies were eventually transformed into local militias.

In the 6th century, Emperor Justinian I, (r. 527–565 AD), sent much of the East Roman military to participate in the partial reconquest of several portions of the former Western Roman Empire. In these wars, the Eastern Roman Empire reconquered parts of North Africa from the Vandal Kingdom, most of Italy from the Ostrogothic Kingdom, and parts of southern Spain. The strength of the East Roman army diminished greatly during Justinian's reign, due in large part to the severe demographic impact of the Plague of Justinian on the population of the Eastern empire. In the 7th century, the East Roman army fought a long and destructive war against the Sasanian Empire under the leadership of Heraclius. Heraclius temporarily regained Egypt and Syria from the Sasanians, but almost immediately faced an invasion by the expanding Rashidun Caliphate. His generals’ defeat at the Battle of Yarmuk lead directly to the Islamic conquest of Syria and Egypt, and ultimately caused the reorganization of the East Roman army into the thematic system of later Byzantine armies.

== Sources ==
Much of the evidence for the East Roman army's deployments at the end of the 4th century is contained in a single document, the Notitia Dignitatum, compiled c. 395–420, a manual of all late Roman public offices, military and civil. The primary deficiency of the Notitia as a source is its lack of any personnel figures, making estimates of army size difficult or impossible. Despite this, the Notitia remains the central source on the late Army's structure due to the dearth of other evidence.

The Strategikon of the Emperor Maurikios, from the end of the 6th century, describes the cavalry tactics, organization, and equipment of the East Roman army towards the end of this period. The De re militari of Vegetius, probably from the beginning of the 5th century, calls for reform of the West Roman army, which was similar to the East Roman army. However, the De re militari emphasizes the revival of earlier Roman practices, and does not provide a clear view of the tactics, organization, and practices of any branch of the late Roman army.

The histories of Ammianus Marcellinus provide a glimpse of the late Roman army before the division of the Roman Empire. Those of Procopius, especially his Wars and parts of his Buildings, written while accompanying the magister militum Belisarius during the emperor Justinian's wars against the Sassanid Empire and the barbarian successor kingdoms, provide a view of the East Roman army in the period, and its campaigns. The histories of Agathias and Menander continue those of Procopius.

Another major source for the East Roman army includes the legal codes published in the Eastern Roman Empire in the 5th and 6th centuries: the Theodosian code (438) and the Corpus Iuris Civilis (528-39). These compilations of Roman laws dating from the 4th century contain numerous imperial decrees relating to the regulation and administration of the late army.

== Origins and history ==
In 395, the death of the last sole Roman emperor, Theodosius I (r. 379–395 AD), led to the final split of the empire into two political entities, the West (Occidentale) and the East (Orientale). A system of dual emperors (called Augusti after the founder of the empire, Augustus), each ruling one half of the empire as nominal imperial partners, had been instituted a century earlier by the reforms of the emperor Diocletian (r. 284–305 AD). This had never been envisaged as a true political separation, but rather as an administrative and military necessity. Decrees issued by either emperor were valid in both halves of the empire, and the successor of each Augustus required the recognition of the other. The empire was reunited under one emperor under Constantine I after 324, under Constantius II after 353, under Julian after 361, and under Theodosius himself after 394.

The division of the Roman state into two sections accompanied a growing cultural divergence between east and west. The common language of the East had always been Greek, while that of the West was Latin. This was not per se a significant division, as the empire had long been a fusion of Greek and Roman cultures (classical civilisation) and the Roman ruling class was entirely bilingual. But the rise of Christianity strained that unity, as the religion was always much more widespread in the East than in the West, which was still largely pagan in 395. Constantine's massive reconstruction of the city of Byzantium into Constantinople, a second capital to rival Rome, led to the establishment of a separate eastern court, senate and administrative bureaucracy.

The political split became institutionally formalized over the course of the collapse of the Western Roman Empire in the 5th century, during which the central authority of the Western emperor was gradually supplanted by the local rule of a number of barbarian Germanic chieftains. Following the deposition of Western emperor Romulus Augustulus by Ostrogothic leader Odoacer in 476, the senate in Rome sent the Western imperial insignia to Constantinople, along with a message recognizing Eastern emperor Zeno as sole Augustus. In response, and in tacit acceptance of the new political order, Zeno declined to nominate an imperial colleague in the West, breaking with the dual-emperor system enacted by Diocletian more than 150 years prior. Zeno instead recognized Odoacer as a nominally-subordinate imperial viceroy in Italy, although in practice, both Odoacer and his Germanic contemporaries ruling other areas of the former Western empire were independent from Roman rule.

By this time, the Western Roman army consisted primarily of foederati, non-Roman barbarian troops operating under the command of their own chieftains, functionally independent from the Western imperial court in Ravenna. As these chieftains asserted their independence from imperial authority, simultaneously removing their troops from imperial command, the Western Roman army also therefore ceased to exist as an institution.

The Eastern Roman army, on the other hand, maintained a structure that was administratively continuous with the Late Roman military of the 4th century AD, undergoing gradual changes until experiencing radical reform in the wake of the Persian and Arab invasions of the 7th century. On the eve of these invasions, at the end of the 6th century, the East Roman army still adhered to the same basic division between mobile field armies (comitatenses) and frontier troops (limitanei) that existed in the 4th century. Despite this high-level structural continuity, throughout the 5th and 6th centuries, several important changes took place, including an erosion of previously strict organizational boundaries between Roman troops and non-Roman foederati allies, as well as an increasing reliance on bucellarii, the household guard units of high-ranking Eastern Roman officers and officials.

Following Eastern empire's loss of its dominions in the Near East and North Africa, especially Egypt, to the Arab invasions of the 7th century, the East Roman military underwent a dramatic structural re-organization into the theme system. Mobile field armies were settled in military-administrative districts within the empire's remaining territories in Asia Minor, Greece and the Balkan peninsula, eliminating the longstanding distinction between the field armies and frontier troops. This is generally understood as the transition point between the East Roman army of Late Antiquity, and the Byzantine army of the early medieval period.

== Army size ==
Warren Treadgold estimates that the Eastern Roman army had about 3,500 scolae or guards, 104,000 field army soldiers, with an uncertain number of sailors, and 195,500 border army soldiers, again with an uncertain number of sailors, in 395.

Treadgold also estimates that the Eastern Roman army had about 150,000 field army soldiers, in 559, late in the period of Justinian. He later estimated that the number of frontier troops and sailors was 229,000, which brought the total size of the army to well over 300,000.

Treadgold also estimates that the Eastern Roman army had about 80,000 field army soldiers, with an uncertain number of sailors, in 641, after the Islamic conquest of Syria and Egypt.

=== Numbers ===
The size of the Eastern army in 395 is controversial because the size of individual regiments is not known with any certainty. Plausible estimates of the size of the whole 4th-century army (excluding fleets) range from c. 400,000 to c. 600,000. This would place the Eastern army in the rough range 200,000 to 300,000, since the army of each division of the empire was roughly equal.

The higher end of the range is provided by the late 6th-century military historian Agathias, who gives a global total of 645,000 effectives for the army "in the old days", presumed to mean when the empire was united. This figure probably includes fleets, giving a total of c. 600,000 for the army alone. Agathias is supported by A.H.M. Jones' Later Roman Empire (1964), which contains the fundamental study of the late Roman army. Jones calculated a similar total of 600,000 (exc. fleets) by applying his own estimates of unit strength to the units listed in the Notitia Dignitatum. Following Jones, Treadgold suggests 300,000 for the East in 395.

But there are strong reasons to view 200,000 as more likely:

1. Jones' assumptions about unit strengths, based on papyri evidence from Egypt, are probably too high. A rigorous reassessment of the evidence by R. Duncan-Jones concluded that Jones had overestimated unit sizes by 2-5 times.
2. The evidence is that regiments were typically one-third understrength in the 4th century. Thus Agathias' 600,000 on paper (if it is based on official figures at all) may in reality have translated into only 400,000 actual troops on the ground.
3. Agathias gives a figure of 150,000 for the army in his own time (late 6th century) which is more likely to be accurate than his figures for the 4th century. If Agathias' 4th- and 6th-century figures are taken together, they would imply that Justinian's empire was defended by only half the troops that supposedly defended the earlier empire, despite having to cover even more territory (the reconquered provinces of Italy, Africa and S. Spain), which seems inherently unlikely.

The discrepancy in army size estimates is mainly due to uncertainty about the size of limitanei regiments, as can be seen by the wide range of estimates in the table below. Jones suggests limitanei regiments had a similar size to Principate auxilia regiments, averaging 500 men each. More recent work, which includes new archaeological evidence, tends to the view that units were much smaller, perhaps averaging 250.

There is less dispute about comitatus regiments, because of more evidence. Treadgold estimates the 5 comitatus armies of the East as containing c. 20,000 men each, for a total of c. 100,000, which constitutes either one-third or one-half of the total army.

About one third of the army units in the Notitia are cavalry, but cavalry numbers were less than that proportion of the total because cavalry unit sizes were smaller. The available evidence suggests that the proportion of cavalry was about one-fifth of the total effectives: in 478, a comitatus of 38,000 men contained 8,000 cavalry (21%).

== Higher command ==
High command structure of the East Roman army c. 395 AD. Based on the Notitia Dignitatum, a late Roman manual of official posts

The later 4th-century army contained three types of army group: (1) Imperial escort armies (comitatus praesentales). These were ordinarily based near Constantinople, but often accompanied the emperors on campaign. (2) Regional armies (comitatus). These were based in strategic regions, on or near the frontiers. (3) Border armies (exercitus limitanei). These were based on the frontiers themselves.

The command structure of the Eastern army, as recorded in the Notitia Dignitatum, is represented diagrammatically in the organisation chart (above).

By the end of the 4th century, there were two comitatus praesentales in the East. They wintered near Constantinople at Nicaea and Nicomedia. Each was commanded by a magister militum ("master of soldiers", the highest military rank) Each magister was assisted by a deputy called a vicarius.

There were three major regional comitatus, also with apparently settled winter bases: Oriens (based at Antioch), Thraciae (Marcianopolis), Illyricum (Sirmium) plus two smaller forces in Aegyptus (Alexandria) and Isauria. The large comitatus were commanded by magistri, the smaller ones by comites. All five reported direct to the eastern Augustus. This structure remained essentially intact until the 6th century.

== Army organization ==
Units were classified according to whether they were attached to the guard (excubitores and scholae), the field armies (palatini and comitatenses) or the border armies (limitanei).

The strength of these units is very uncertain and may have varied over the 5th and 6th centuries. Size may also have varied depending on the status of the regiment. The table below gives some recent estimates of unit strength, by unit type and grade:

Estimated size of units in the 4th-century army
Cavalry unit type	Comitatenses (inc. palatini)	Limitanei	XXXXX	Infantry unit type	Comitatenses (inc. palatini)	Limitanei
Ala		120-500		Auxilia	800-1,200 or 400-600	400-600
Cuneus		200-300		Cohors		160-500
Equites		80-300		Legio	800-1,200	500
Schola	500			Milites		200-300
Vexillatio	400-600			Numerus		200-300

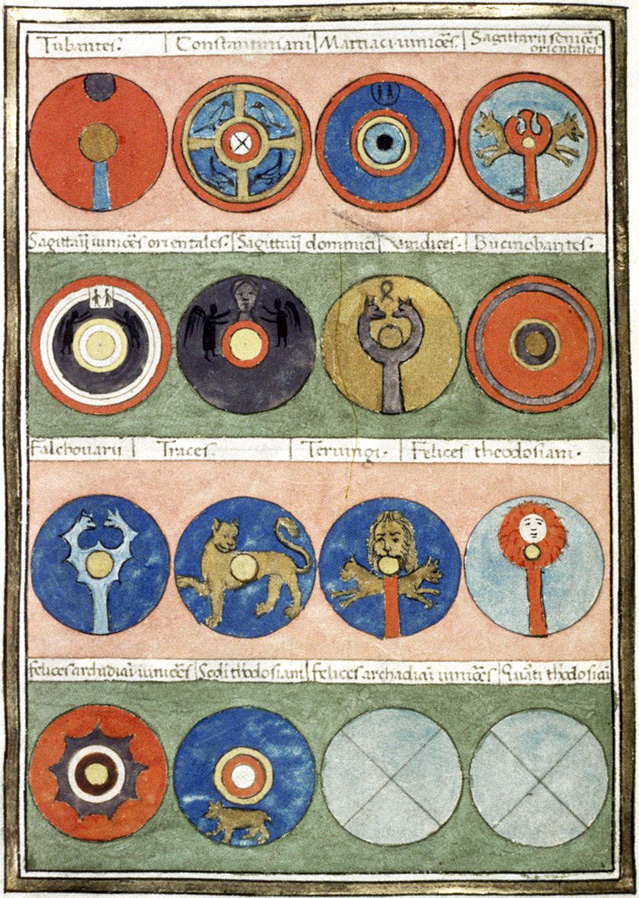
Shield insignia of regiments under the command of the Magister Militum Praesentalis II of the East Roman army c. 395 AD. Page from the Notitia Dignitatum

The overall picture is that comitatenses units were either c. 1,000 or c. 500 strong. Limitanei units would appear to average about 250 effectives. But much uncertainty remains, especially regarding the size of limitanei regiments, as can be seen by the wide ranges of the size estimates.

=== Excubitores ===
The emperor Leo I created the Excubitores as an elite bodyguard of about 300 soldiers. However, the intrigues and political ambitions of their commanders (The Counts of the Excubitors, rendered in Latin as comes excubitorum) such as Priscus during the reigns of the emperors Maurice, Phocas and Heraclius and the Count Valentinus during the reign of Emperor Constans II, doomed Leo I's formerly famed Isaurian unit to obscurity.

=== Scholae ===
The emperor Constantine I created the Scholae Palatinae as an elite guards unit of about 6,000 soldiers, and to replace the Praetorian Guard of about 10,000 soldiers. 40 select troops from the scholae, called candidati from their white uniforms, acted as the emperor's personal bodyguards. Apart from the Agentes in Rebus, the Scholae were originally organized as cavalry units to accompany the emperors on campaign, although later, individual members of the Scholae could have non-military missions. Eventually, Justinian auctioned off positions in what was still a prestigious ceremonial unit, but no longer a fighting force.

They were outside the normal military chain of command as they did not belong to the comitatus praesentales and reported to the magister officiorum, a civilian official. However, this was probably only for administrative purposes: on campaign, the tribunes commanding each schola probably reported direct to the emperor himself.

The Notitia Dignitatum lists 7 scolae of cavalry and 1 of agents in the East Roman empire, as well as 5 of cavalry and 1 of agents in the West Roman empire.

=== Palatini and Comitatenses ===
Comitatenses cavalry units were known as vexillationes, infantry units as either legiones or auxilia. About half the units in the comitatus, both cavalry and infantry, were classified as palatini. The palatini were the majority of the comitatus praesentales (80% of regiments) and constituted a minority of the regional comitatus (14%). The palatini were an elite group with higher status and probably pay.

The majority of cavalry units in the comitatus were traditional melee formations (61%). These units were denoted scutarii, stablesiani or promoti, probably honorific titles rather than descriptions of function. 24% of regiments were light cavalry: equites Dalmatae, Mauri and sagittarii (mounted archers). 15% were heavily armoured shock charge cavalry: cataphracti and clibanarii

=== Limitanei ===
The limitanei garrisoned fortifications along the borders of the Roman Empire. They were lower-status and lower-paid than the comitatenses and palatini. The nature of the limitanei changed considerably between their introduction in the 3rd or 4th century and their disappearance in the 6th or 7th century. In the 4th century, the limitanei were professional soldiers, and included both infantry and cavalry as well as river flotillas, but after the 5th century they were part-time soldiers, and after the 6th century they were unpaid militia. The limitanei between the 4th and 6th centuries were commanded by a duke (duces). Dukes essentially controlled private armies which operated separately from the imperial army. However, during the 6th century the power wielded by these dukes diminished meaning that many of the limitanei became part-time soldiers who supported their income usually through agricultural labour. The role of the limitanei appears to have included garrisoning frontier fortifications, operating as border guards and customs police, and preventing small-scale raids.

== Recruitment ==
Although the Eastern Roman army sometimes turned to conscription it usually relied on volunteer soldiers. Shortages of money, rather than of manpower, usually limited recruitment.

In 395, the army used Latin as its operating language. This continued to be the case into the late 6th century, despite the fact that Greek was the common language of the Eastern empire. This was not simply due to tradition, but also to the fact that about half the Eastern army continued to be recruited in the Latin-speaking Danubian regions of the Eastern empire. An analysis of known origins of comitatenses in the period 350-476 shows that in the Eastern army, the Danubian regions provided 54% of the total sample, despite constituting just 2 of the 7 eastern dioceses (administrative divisions): Dacia and Thracia. These regions continued to be the prime recruiting grounds for the Eastern Roman army e.g. the emperor Justin I (r. 518-27), uncle of Justinian I, was a Latin-speaking peasant who never learnt to speak more than rudimentary Greek. The Romanized Thracian and Illyrian inhabitants of those regions, who came to be known as Vlachs by foreigners in the Middle Ages, retained the Roman name (Romanians) and the Latin tongue.

== Tactics ==
=== Heavy infantry ===
The Eastern Roman heavy infantry relied on their spears and shields in close combat. These weapons were most effective when the soldiers fought in formation.

=== Maurikios' Strategikon ===
The Strategikon is the earliest surviving Roman/Byzantine cavalry manual, and directly influenced later Byzantine military manuals. The Strategikon describes the organization, equipment, and tactics of the east Roman army at the end of this period.

== Equipment ==
The Eastern Roman army included both light and heavy infantry, as well as light and heavy cavalry.

The equipment of the Eastern Roman army changed considerably between the 4th and 7th Centuries. By the end of the period, the cavalry had armor and horse armor, with both bows and lances as weapons. The heavy infantry still had armor, with large shields, spears, and swords. The light infantry had bows.

M.C. Bishop and J.C.M. Coulston, in a major work on Roman military equipment, do not distinguish the equipment of the various branches of the Roman military. It is doubtful whether there were any universal differences between the equipment of the palatini, comitatenses, and limitanei.

The late Roman Empire had centralized fabricae, introduced by Diocletian, to provide arms and armor for the army. The introduction of the centralized fabricae, where earlier armies had relied on legionary workshops, may reflect the needs of the field armies.

The basic equipment of a 4th-century foot soldier was essentially the same as in the 2nd century: metal armour cuirass, metal helmet, shield and sword. Some evolution took place during the 3rd century. Trends included the adoption of warmer clothing; the disappearance of distinctive legionary armour and weapons; the adoption by the infantry of equipment used by the cavalry in the earlier period; and the greater use of heavily armoured cavalry called cataphracts.

=== Clothing ===
According to the Strategikon, the cavalry soldiers should have long "Avar" tunics reaching past the knees, and large cloaks with sleeves.

According to the Strategikon, the infantry soldiers should have long "Gothic" tunics reaching the knees, or short ones with split sides, as well as "Gothic" shoes with thick hobnailed soles, and "Bulgarian" cloaks.

In the 1st and 2nd centuries, a Roman soldier's clothes consisted of a single-piece, short-sleeved tunic whose hem reached the knees and special hobnailed sandals (caligae). This attire, which left the arms and legs bare, had evolved in a Mediterranean climate and was not suitable for northern Europe in cold weather. In northern Europe, long-sleeved tunics, trousers (bracae), socks (worn inside the caligae) and laced boots were commonly worn in winter from the 1st century. During the 3rd century, these items of clothing became much more widespread, apparently common in Mediterranean provinces also. However, it is likely that in warmer weather, trousers were dispensed with and caligae worn instead of socks and boots. Late Roman clothing was often highly decorated, with woven or embroidered strips, clavi, and circular roundels, orbiculi, added to tunics and cloaks. These decorative elements usually consisted of geometrical patterns and stylised plant motifs, but could include human or animal figures. A distinctive part of a soldier's costume, though it seems to have also been worn by non-military bureaucrats, was a type of round, brimless hat known as the pannonian cap (pileus pannonicus).

=== Armour ===
In the 3rd century, troops are depicted wearing mail or scale armour. The artistic record shows that most late soldiers wore metal armour, despite Vegetius' statement to the contrary. For example, illustrations in the Notitia show that the army's fabricae (arms factories) were producing mail armour at the end of the 4th century. Actual examples of both scale armour and quite large sections of mail have been recovered, at Trier and Weiler-La-Tour respectively, within 4th-century contexts. Officers generally seem to have worn bronze or iron cuirasses, as in the days of the Principate, together with traditional pteruges. The cataphract and clibanarii cavalry, from limited pictorial evidence and especially from the description of these troops by Ammianus, seem to have worn specialist forms of armour. In particular their limbs were protected by laminated defences, made up of curved and overlapping metal segments: "Laminarum circuli tenues apti corporis flexibus ambiebant per omnia membra diducti" (Thin circles of iron plates, fitted to the curves of their bodies, completely covered their limbs).

=== Helmets ===
In general, Roman cavalry helmets had enhanced protection, in the form of wider cheek-guards and deeper neck-guards, for the sides and back of the head than infantry helmets. Infantry were less vulnerable in those parts due to their tighter formation when fighting. During the 3rd century, infantry helmets tended to adopt the more protective features of cavalry helmets of the Principate. Cheek-guards could often be fastened together over the chin to protect the face, and covered the ears save for a slit to permit hearing e.g. the "Auxiliary E" type or its Niederbieber variant. Cavalry helmets became even more enclosed e.g. the "Heddernheim" type, which is close to the medieval great helm, but at the cost much reduced vision and hearing.

In contrast, some infantry helmets in the 4th century reverted to the more open features of the main Principate type, the "Imperial Gallic". The "Intercisa" design left the face unobstructed and had ear-holes in the join between cheek-guards and bowl to allow good hearing. In a radical change from the earlier single-bowl design, the Intercisa bowl was made of two separate pieces joined by a riveted ridge in the middle (hence the term "ridge helmet"). It was simpler and cheaper to manufacture, and therefore probably by far the most common type, but structurally weaker and therefore offered less effective protection. The "Berkasovo" type was a more sturdy and protective ridge helmet. This type of helmet usually has 4 to 6 skull elements (and the characteristic median ridge), a nasal (nose-guard), a deep brow piece riveted inside the skull elements and large cheekpieces. This was probably the cavalry version, as the cheekpieces lack ear-holes. Unusually the helmet discovered at Burgh Castle, in England, is of the Berkasovo method of construction, but has cheekpieces with earholes. Face-guards of mail or in the form of metal 'anthropomorphic masks,' with eye-holes, were often added to the helmets of the heaviest forms of cavalry, especially cataphracti.

Despite the apparent cheapness of manufacture of their basic components, many surviving examples of Late Roman helmets, including the Intercisa type, show evidence of expensive decoration in the form of silver or silver-gilt sheathing. A possible explanation is that most of the surviving exemplars may have belonged to officers and that silver- or gold-plating denoted rank; and, in the case of mounted gemstones, high rank e.g. the ornate Deurne helmet, believed by some historians to have belonged to a senior officer. Other academics, in contrast, consider that silver-sheathed helmets may have been widely worn by comitatus soldiers, given as a form of pay or reward.

Some Eastern Roman soldiers wore mail or scale hoods for head protection; these could be part of mail coats or could be separate coifs. Similar armoured hoods appear in an illustration in the Vergilius Vaticanus.

=== Shields ===
Shields were both protective equipment for the soldiers and insignia for their units. Both Vegetius, in De re Militari, and Mauricius, in the Strategikon, emphasize that each unit should have distinctive shields.

Lance-armed cavalry carried shields, although bow-armed cavalry generally did not.

All troops adopted the auxiliary oval (or sometimes round) shield (clipeus). Shields, from examples found at Dura and Nydam, were of vertical plank construction, the planks glued, and faced inside and out with painted leather. The edges of the shield were bound with stitched rawhide, which shrank as it dried improving structural cohesion. It was also lighter than the edging of copper alloy used in earlier Roman shields.

=== Hand-to-hand weapons ===
The Eastern Roman heavy infantry relied on the spear in close combat. No late Roman or Eastern Roman spear shafts survive, but I.P. Stephenson suggests that Eastern Roman spears may have been as long as northern European spears discovered in the bog deposits at Illerup and Nydam, between 2.23 meters and 3.54 meters long.

The infantry adopted the spatha, a longer (median length: 760 mm/30 in) sword that during the earlier centuries was used by the cavalry only. In addition, Vegetius mentions the use of a shorter-bladed sword termed a semispatha. At the same time, infantry acquired a heavy thrusting-spear (hasta) which became the main close order combat weapon to replace the gladius, as the spatha was too long to be swung comfortably in tight formation (although it could be used to stab). These trends imply a greater emphasis on fighting the enemy "at arm's length".

Short, single-edged knives were also used, although probably as tools rather than weapons. These appear in 4th-century graves with military belt fittings, and similar tools appear in 4th through 7th-century contexts.

=== Missile weapons ===
In addition to his thrusting-spear, a late foot soldier might also carry a throwing-spear (verutum) or a spiculum, a kind of heavy, long pilum, similar to an angon. Alternatively, a couple of short javelins (lanceae). Late infantrymen often carried half a dozen lead-weighted throwing-darts called plumbatae (from plumbum = "lead"), with an effective range of c. 30 m (98 ft), well beyond that of a javelin. The darts were carried clipped to the back of the shield. The late foot soldier thus had greater missile capability than his Principate predecessor, who was usually limited to just two pila. Late Roman archers continued to use the recurved composite bow as their principal weapon. This was a sophisticated, compact and powerful weapon, suitable for mounted and foot archers alike (the cavalry version being more compact than the infantry's). A small number of archers may have been armed with crossbows (manuballistae).

== Campaigns ==
In the 6th century, the emperor Justinian I, who reigned from 527 to 565, sent much of the East Roman army to try to reconquer the former Western Roman Empire. In these wars, the East Roman empire reconquered parts of North Africa from the Vandal kingdom and Italy from the Ostrogothic kingdom, as well as parts of southern Spain. Initially, Justinian was not trying to reconquer former Western Roman territories however, the successes of Belisarius' campaigns against the Vandals in 533-534 would lead Justinian into undertaking further military campaigns by launching a war against the Ostrogoths of Italy in 535. In the 7th century, the emperor Heraclius led the east Roman army against the Sassanid Empire, temporarily regaining Egypt and Syria, and then against the Rashidun Caliphate. His generals’ defeat at the Battle of Yarmuk would lead to the Islamic conquest of Syria and Egypt, and would force the reorganization of the East Roman army, leading to the thematic system of later Byzantine armies.

== Bibliography ==
- Duncan-Jones, Richard (1990). Structure and Scale in the Roman Economy.
- Duncan-Jones, Richard (1994). Money and Government in the Roman Empire.
- Elton, Hugh (1996). Warfare in Roman Europe, AD 350-425. Oxford University Press. ISBN 978-0-19-815241-5.
- Goldsworthy, Adrian (2000). Roman Warfare.
- Goldsworthy, Adrian (2005). Complete Roman Army.
- Heather, Peter (2005). Fall of the Roman Empire.
- Isaac, B. (1992). Limits of Empire.
- Jones, A.H.M. (1964). Later Roman Empire.
- Kaldellis, Anthony; Kruse, Marion (11 May 2023). The Field Armies of the East Roman Empire, 361–630. Cambridge University Press. ISBN 978-1-009-29694-6.
- Luttwak, Edward (1976). Grand Strategy of the Roman Empire. Johns Hopkins University Press. ISBN 978-0-8018-1863-9.
- Treadgold, Warren (1995). Byzantium and its Army (284-1081).
- Wacher, John (1988). The Roman World.
