= Phocas =

Roman emperor from 602 to 610

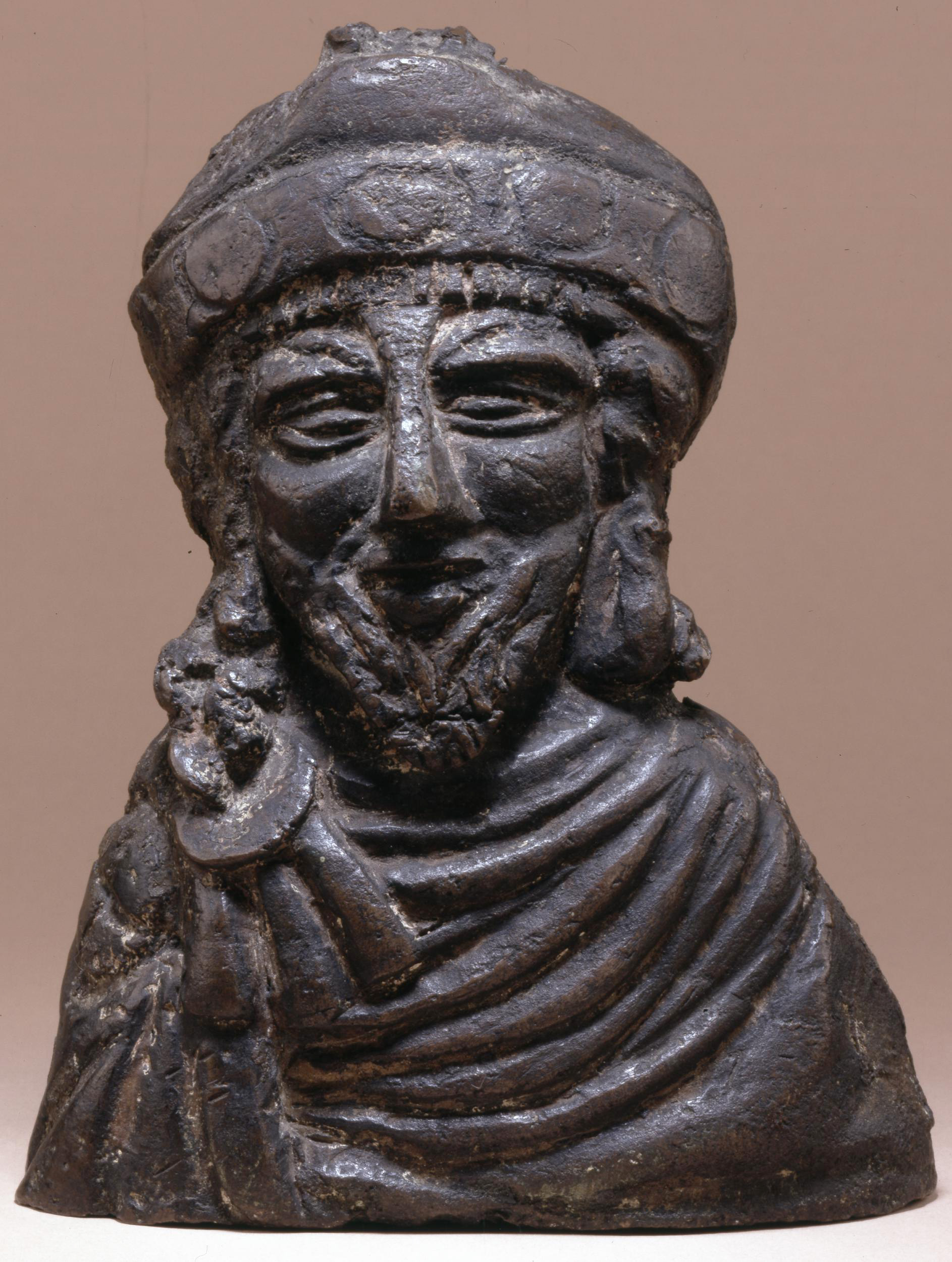
- 7th-century bronze steelyard-weight housed at the British Museum, probably representing Emperor Phocas

Eastern Roman emperor
- Reign: 23 November 602 – 5 October 610
- Predecessor: Maurice
- Successor: Heraclius
- Born: 547; Thracia or Cappadocia
- Died: 5 October 610 (aged 62–63); Constantinople
- Spouse: Leontia
- Issue: Domentzia
Regnal name
- Imperator Caesar Flavius Focas Augustus (Note: His name is sometimes given as Flavius Niceforus Focas. However, this is not corroborated by other sources and may be out of confusion with the later Nikephoros II Phokas.)
- Mother: Domentzia
- Religion: Chalcedonian Christianity

Phocas (Latin: Focas; Ancient Greek: Φωκᾶς, romanized: Phōkás; 547 – 5 October 610) was Eastern Roman emperor from 602 to 610. Initially a middle-ranking officer in the East Roman army, Phocas rose to prominence as a spokesman for dissatisfied soldiers in their disputes with the court of the Emperor Maurice. When the army rebelled in 602, Phocas emerged as the leader of the mutiny. The revolt led to the overthrow and execution of Maurice in November 602.

Phocas deeply mistrusted the uncooperative elite of Constantinople, to whom he was a usurper and a provincial boor. He therefore attempted to base his regime on relatives installed in high military and administrative positions. He immediately faced challenges in domestic and foreign affairs, and responded with little success. He dealt with domestic opposition with increasing ruthlessness that alienated ever wider circles, including some of his own household. The Sasanian Empire launched a massive invasion of the eastern provinces. Finally, the exarch of Africa, Heraclius the Elder, rebelled against Phocas and gained wide support throughout the empire. Phocas attempted to use border troops to crush the rebellion, but this only resulted in allowing invaders to break into the heartlands of the Empire. Heraclius the Elder's son, Heraclius, took Constantinople on 5 October 610, executed Phocas the same day, and declared himself emperor.

Surviving sources are universally extremely hostile to Phocas. He is described as an incompetent tyrant and usurper who brutally purged any real or perceived opposition and left the Empire wide open to foreign aggression. The veracity of these sources is difficult to ascertain since emperors of the Heraclian dynasty who succeeded Phocas had a vested interest in tarnishing his reputation.

== Life ==
=== Early life ===
Phocas was most likely born in 547, as he was said to be aged 55 when he became emperor. He was likely of Thraco-Roman or Cappadocian origin. The life of Phocas before his usurpation of the Byzantine Empire's throne is obscure, but he was said to have served as a centurion in the army in Thrace under Emperor Maurice.

Late in Maurice's reign, the army sent Phocas to Constantinople as their spokesperson to complain about the conduct of general Comentiolus. As Phocas presented their case, he argued with the emperor, and as a result, had his beard pulled by an outraged patrician.

=== Usurpation ===
In autumn 602, the Thracian army rebelled against Maurice, largely due to exhaustion and outrage over orders to continue campaigning north of the Danube in winter, as well as previous cuts in wages. The army initially sent a delegation, which included Phocas, to general Peter and demanded a dismissal within the Roman borders. But when Maurice reiterated his command, the troops made Phocas their leader and started marching to Constantinople. They insisted that Maurice abdicate and offered to proclaim as successors Theodosius, son and co-emperor of Maurice, or his father-in-law Germanus. As Maurice tried to arrest Germanus, riots broke out in Constantinople. That night, on 22 November 602, Maurice and his family fled on a warship to Bithynia, sending Theodosius on a mission to ask for Persian King Khusrow II's help. According to Theophylact Simocatta (c. 630), Germanus initially made an attempt for the throne, but when rebuffed by the Greens, he paid homage to Phocas, who had emerged as the heavy favorite.

On 23 November 602, Phocas was crowned by the patriarch Cyriacus in the church of St John the Baptist at the Hebdomon. He entered Constantinople in a ceremonial procession two days later, on 25 November, while being unanimously acclaimed.

Maurice and his sons were soon captured and executed. There were, however, stories that Theodosius managed to escape to Persia. Maurice's wife, Constantina, and their daughters, were placed in a monastery; possibly that of St. Mamas. They were executed around 605, when Constantina and Germanus were found conspiring after hearing rumors of Theodosius' survival.

=== Foreign conflict ===
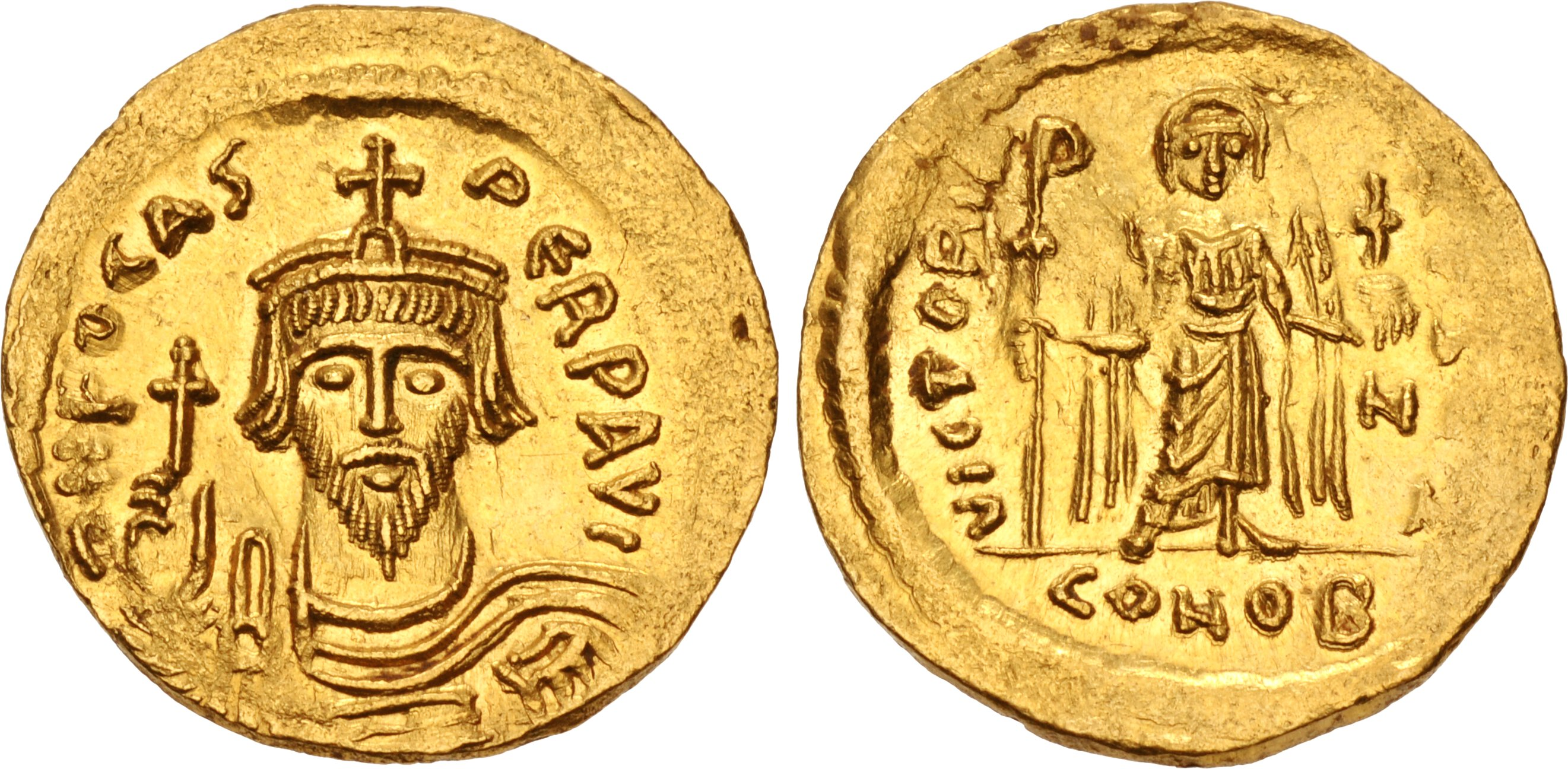
A solidus of Phocas minted c. 608; on the reverse, it depicts an angel holding the globus cruciger.

Despite the executions of the previous emperor and his dynastic successors, Phocas remained in a precarious position, which led him to devote his energy to purging enemies and destroying conspiracies. The Sassanian Empire launched an invasion of the eastern provinces of the empire.

During his reign, the Balkan frontier remained stable. He concluded a treaty with the Avars in 604, though warfare flared up again as a consequence of the Heraclian rebellion in 609.

The Sassanid Persians had formerly been at peace with Maurice as a result of a treaty they made with him in 591. After Phocas usurped and killed Maurice, the Persians invaded the empire in 603. Khosrow II had imprisoned the Byzantine ambassador sent by Phocas to announce Phocas' ascension to the throne and sent an army that managed to defeat the Byzantines and killed Germanus. Phocas proceeded to conclude peace treaties with the Avars and the Lombards, which enabled him to send troops from the Balkans to the east under the command of the palace eunuch Leontius. However, Khosrow II was able to defeat Leontius and his forces near Dara, and in the process captured many prisoners. The following year, the Persians carried out a raid at the border region unopposed, and the Byzantines were unable to stop the Persians. The Sassanids rapidly occupied the eastern provinces, leading the Magister militum per Orientem, Narses, to defect to their side. Phocas swiftly dealt with him, by inviting him to Constantinople under the promise of safe conduct, then having him burnt alive when he arrived. Though Dara was lost in connection with the revolt, Phocas was able to fight the Sasanians to a standstill until 606, with no further major strongholds falling. Between 607 and 610, the armies of Khosrow managed to slowly conquer the Mesopotamian fortresses, and by August 610, they had established a bridgehead across the Euphrates. The plague and invasions led to a poor harvest, which was exacerbated by the rebellion of the exarch of Africa Heraclius, who halted shipments of grain to Constantinople. Some historians blame the civil war between Phocas and Heraclius for the collapse of the eastern frontier in the following years.

Contemporary accounts describe the Persians as being very brutal to the occupied population. The 'miracle of St Demetrios' described the carnage:

[T]he devil raised the whirlwind of hatred in all the East, Cilicia, Asia, Palestine and all the lands from there to Constantinople: the factions, no longer content simply to spill blood in public places, attacked homes, slaughtered women, children, the aged, and the young who were sick; those whose youth and frailty impeded their escape from the massacre, [saw] their friends, acquaintances, and parents pillaged, and after all that, even set on fire so that the most wretched inhabitant was not able to escape.

=== Administration ===
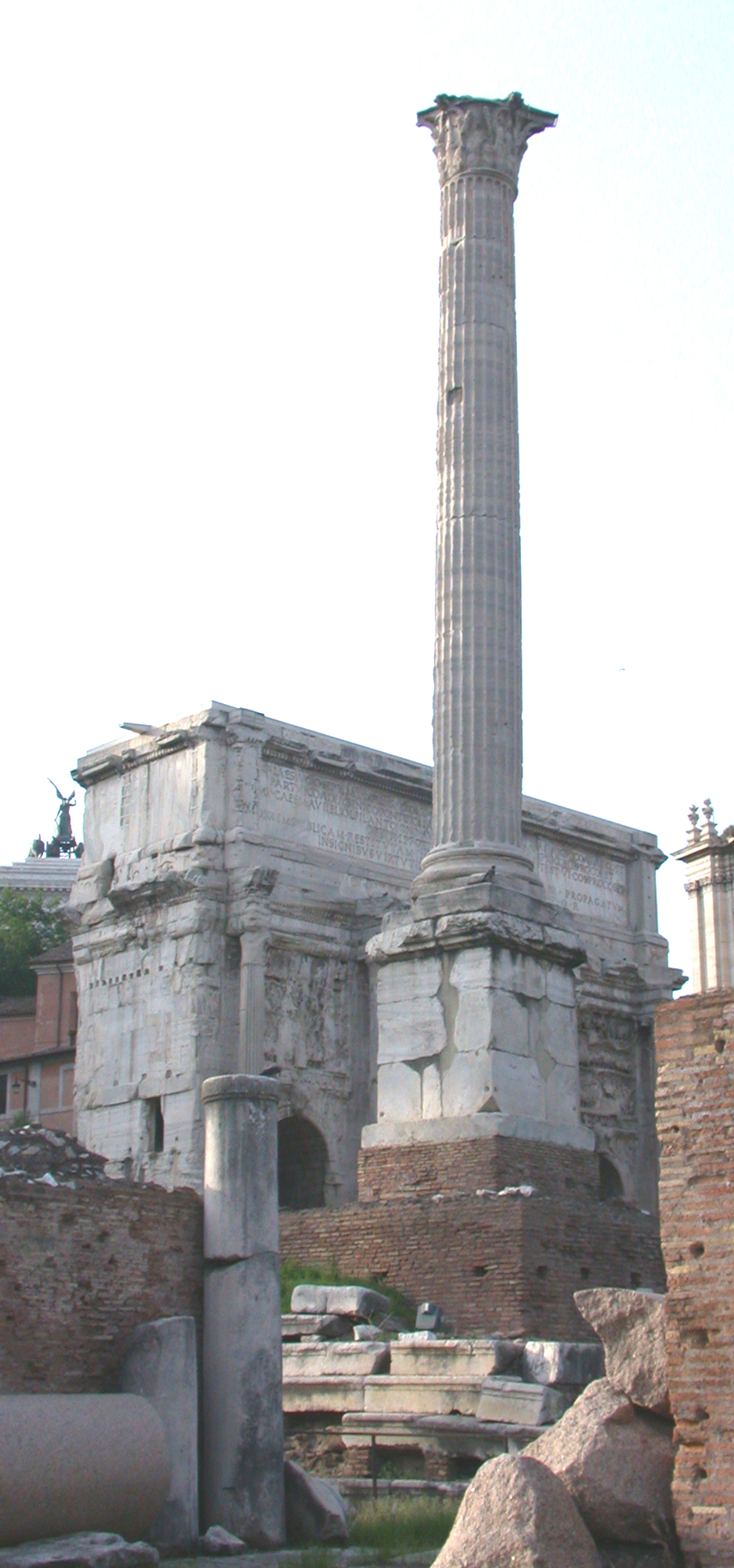
The Column of Phocas in Rome

Phocas frequently filled senior posts with his relatives, due to his isolation from the bulk of Constantinople's elite, with whom he had had no connection before, or because of Constantinople's system of imperial patronage which prioritized loyalty to the emperor. Phocas installed: his brother Domentziolus as Magister officiorum in 603; his nephew Domentziolus as Magister militum per Orientem in 604, giving him command over the eastern provinces; and his brother Comentiolus as Magister militum per Orientem around 610. All three remained loyal to Phocas until they were killed by Heraclius. On the other hand, Phocas appointed Priscus, a general under Maurice, as the Count of the Excubitors (comes excubitorum) in 603. Priscus would later marry Phocas' daughter Domentzia around 607. During his reign, Phocas was unable to control either the state or the army effectively.

=== Italian policy ===
When Phocas was emperor, Byzantine Italy was under continual attack from Lombards, but the Byzantine government spent few resources to aid Italy due to troubles elsewhere. In the entirety of Phocas' reign, the only public structure built with taxes in the city of Rome was a statue of Phocas completed in 608.

When Phocas usurped Maurice, Gregory the Great was bishop of Rome and he praised Phocas as a restorer of liberty. Gregory referred to him as a pious and clement lord, and compared his wife (the new Empress) Leontia to Marcian's consort Pulcheria (whom the Council of Chalcedon called the new Helena). In May 603, portraits of the imperial couple arrived in Rome and were ordered by the pope to be placed in the oratory of St. Caesarius in the imperial palace on the Palatine.

Imperial approval was needed at that time to appoint a new pope, but the approval was delayed by a year upon the death of Pope Sabinian in 606, as Phocas was occupied with killing internal enemies that threatened his rule. He finally gave approval in 607 and Boniface III became pope. Phocas declared Rome "the head of all churches". Shortly afterwards, Phocas had a gilded statue of himself erected on a monumental column in the Roman Forum, known as the Column of Phocas.

=== Downfall ===
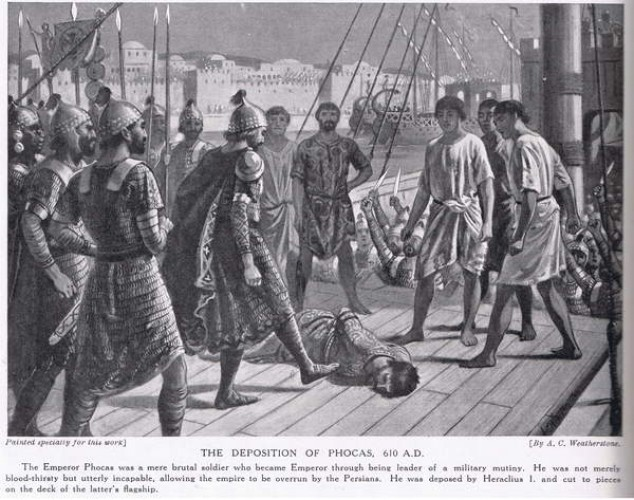
The deposition of Phocas in Hutchinson's History of the Nations (1915)

Despite being appointed as Comes excubitorum, Priscus was not loyal to Phocas, and in 608 he appealed to Heraclius the Elder, the Exarch of Carthage, to rebel against Phocas. Heraclius the Elder agreed, and began to prepare to invade, by cutting off the supply of grain to Constantinople and assembling a large army and navy. Heraclius the Elder launched his invasion in 609, with his nephew, Nicetas, marching troops overland to the capital, and his son, Heraclius, leading a naval invasion of Thessalonica, before marching to Constantinople. Heraclius arrived outside Constantinople on 3 October 610, and seized the city on 5 October. Heraclius was declared emperor on the same day, and swiftly had Phocas executed.

When Heraclius captured Phocas, he was said to have asked him:

"Is this how you have ruled, wretch?"

With Phocas replying:

"And will you rule better?"

The reply enraged Heraclius and he beheaded Phocas on the spot. According to John of Nikiu he later had the genitalia removed from the body because Phocas had allegedly raped the wife of Photius, a powerful politician in the city.

== Legacy ==
Phocas is generally depicted as a villain by Byzantines and modern historians alike, but some of the earliest sources available about Phocas' reign were written during the reign of Heraclius. The writings that survive are not reliably neutral and the writers would have good reason to demonize him in order to strengthen the rule of Heraclius.

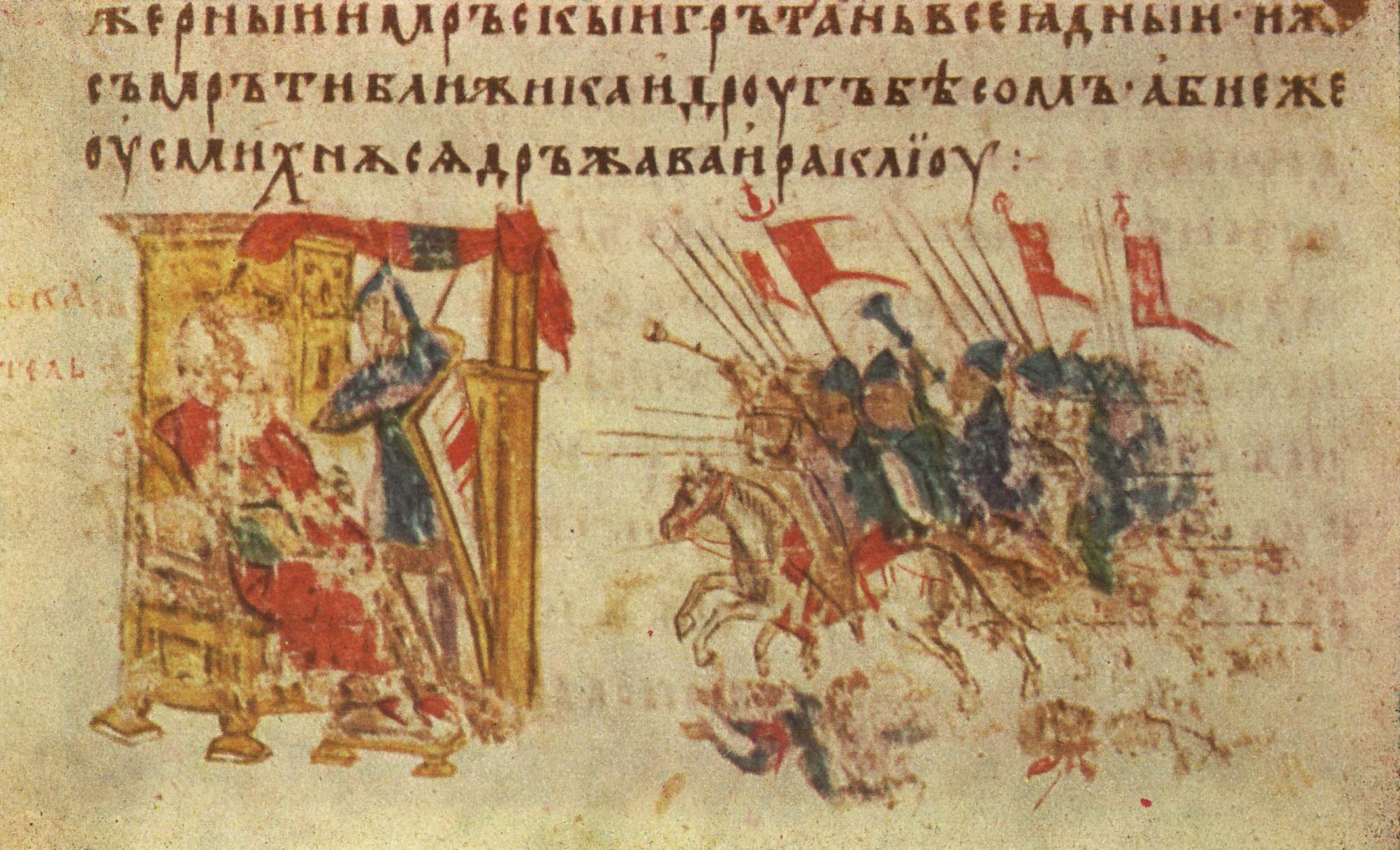
Miniature 41 from Constantine Manasses' Chronicle, 14th century: Usurper Phocas and the assault against him from the armies of Heraclius

The reign of Phocas is marked by the change of imperial fashion set by Constantine the Great (r. 306–337). Starting with Constantine, it became common again to show emperors as clean-shaven on coinage in line with the style of early emperors until the reign of Hadrian (r. 117–138). However, Phocas was consistently depicted with a beard, which became the convention until the end of the Byzantine empire. Virtually all emperors after him were depicted with facial hair.

On 19 February 607, Emperor Phocas appointed Boniface III as the new bishop of Rome. Phocas issued an imperial decree by the Roman government, recognizing Boniface III as the "Head of all Churches" and "Universal Bishop". Phocas transferred the title of "Universal Bishop" from the Diocese of Constantinople to the Diocese of Rome. Boniface sought and obtained a decree from Phocas in which he restated that "the See of Blessed Peter the Apostle should be the head of all the Churches" and ensured that the title of "Universal Bishop" belonged exclusively to the Bishop of Rome. This act effectively ended the attempt by Patriarch Cyriacus of Constantinople to establish himself as "Universal Bishop".

In calling the Pope the "head of all churches", Phocas' decree has been important in discussions about papal primacy and papal supremacy. Some Protestant historicist commentators have seen the decree of Phocas (usually taken to be in 606) as having eschatological significance. For example, in his Horae Apocalypticae, Edward Bishop Elliott took the 1260 days of Revelation 11:3 to be the period between 606 and the Unification of Italy in 1866.

== Bibliography ==
- Crawford, Peter (2013). The War of the Three Gods: Romans, Persians and the Rise of Islam. Pen and Sword. ISBN 9781473829510.
- Crow, Kevin (2002). "Phocas". De Imperatoribus Romanis. Archived from the original on 6 April 2023.
- Garland, Lynda (1999). "Constantina (Wife of the Emperor Maurice)". De Imperatoribus Romanis. Archived from the original on 22 July 2018.
- Howard-Johnston, James (2021). The Last Great War of Antiquity. Oxford: Oxford University Press. ISBN 9780198830191.
- Kaldellis, Anthony (2023). The New Roman Empire: A History of Byzantium. New York: Oxford University Press. ISBN 978-0197549322.
- Kleinhenz, Christopher (2017). Routledge Revivals: Medieval Italy (2004): An Encyclopedia. Taylor & Francis. ISBN 9781351664431.
- Martindale, John R., ed. (1992). The Prosopography of the Later Roman Empire: Volume III, AD 527–641. Cambridge: Cambridge University Press. ISBN 0-521-20160-8.
- Madgearu, Alexandru (1996). "The Province of Scythia and the Avaro-SIavic Invasions (576–626)". Balkan Studies. 37 (1): 35–61.
- Parnell, David Alan (2016). Justinian's Men: Careers and Relationships of Byzantine Army Officers, 518–610. Springer. ISBN 9781137562043.
- Sihong Lin (2021). "Bede, the Papacy, and the Emperors of Constantinople". The English Historical Review. 136 (580): 465–497. doi:10.1093/ehr/ceab113.
- Treadgold, Warren (1997). A History of the Byzantine State and Society. Stanford University Press. ISBN 978-0-8047-7937-1.
- Whitby, Michael; Whitby, Mary (1986). The History of Theophylact Simocatta. Oxford: Clarendon Press. ISBN 978-0-19-822799-1.
- Olster, David Michael (1993). The politics of usurpation in the seventh century: rhetoric and revolution in Byzantium. A. M. Hakkert.
- Charles, Robert H. (2007) [1916]. The Chronicle of John, Bishop of Nikiu: Translated from Zotenberg's Ethiopic Text. Merchantville, NJ: Evolution Publishing. ISBN 978-1-889758-87-9.

Phocas Non-dynastic Born: unknown Died: 610
Regnal titles
Preceded by Maurice and Theodosius	Byzantine Emperor; 602–610	Succeeded by Heraclius
Preceded by Maurice in 583, then lapsed	Roman consul 603	Succeeded by Heraclius the Elder and Heraclius in 608
