= Priscus (magister militum) =

Byzantine military officer

- Relatives: Husband of Domentzia, son-in-law of Emperor Phocas and Leontia
- Military career
- Allegiance: Eastern Roman Empire
- Branch: East Roman army
- Rank: magister militum per Orientem and per Thracias, comes excubitorum
- Conflicts: Maurice's Balkan campaigns, Byzantine–Sassanid Wars

Priscus or Priskos (Greek: Πρῖσκος; died 613) was a leading Eastern Roman general during the reigns of the Byzantine emperors Maurice (reigned 582–602), Phocas (r. 602–610) and Heraclius (r. 610–641). Priscus comes across as an effective and capable military leader, although the contemporary sources are markedly biased in his favour. Under Maurice, he distinguished himself in the campaigns against the Avars and their Slavic allies in the Balkans. Absent from the capital at the time of Maurice's overthrow and murder by Phocas, he was one of the few of Maurice's senior aides who were able to survive unharmed into the new regime, remaining in high office and even marrying the new emperor's daughter. Priscus, however, also negotiated with and assisted Heraclius in the overthrow of Phocas, and was entrusted with command against the Persians in 611–612. After the failure of this campaign, he was dismissed and tonsured. He died shortly after.

== Biography ==
=== Under Maurice ===
Map of the Byzantine-Persian frontier

Priscus first appears in the historical sources when he was appointed, in late 587 or early 588, to command in the East against the Persians as magister militum per Orientem, replacing Philippicus. He only reached the East in spring, and assumed his new command at Monocarton in April. Priscus immediately ran into trouble with the soldiers: his haughty manner in refusing to mingle with them made him unpopular, and when a decree by Emperor Maurice which reduced army pay by a quarter was announced, the soldiers mutinied on Easter day, 18 April 588. Priscus not only failed to restore order, but was himself attacked and forced to flee to Constantina, while the soldiers elected the dux of Phoenice, Germanus, as their leader. Priscus's attempts from Constantina to calm the soldiers by employing the local bishops as mediators and rescinding the decree also failed. Philippicus was restored to command by Maurice, while Priscus returned to Constantinople.

Despite this debacle, in the same summer he was entrusted with the post of magister militum for Thrace, and tasked with campaigning against the Avars at the head of an improvised force. His deputy (hypostrategos) Salvianus with 1,000 cavalry was sent to hold the passes of the Haemus Mountains, but after two days was forced by the Avars' numerical superiority to withdraw. The Avars sacked the city of Anchialos, but an attempted siege of Drizipera was broken off and the Avars marched south, reaching Heraclea Perinthus and cutting Priscus's forces off from Constantinople. Outflanked, Priscus retreated to Tzurullum, where he was besieged by the Avars. The 7th-century historian Theophylact Simocatta reports that after a few days, Priscus devised a stratagem to force the Avars to withdraw: he allowed one of his guards to be captured, bearing a fake letter purportedly coming from Maurice that informed Priscus of a seaborne attack against the Avars' homeland. The Avar khagan was persuaded that the letter was true and prepared to return home in haste; he arranged for a truce in exchange for the renewed payment of an annual tribute. The 12th-century history of Michael the Syrian gives this as 800 pounds of gold (some 60,000 solidi), a considerably reduced sum compared to the 100,000 solidi agreed in 584. The Avars departed for their country, while Priscus disbanded his army and returned to Constantinople. Priscus disappears for the next few years, as he fell into disfavour with Maurice. By 593, he had recovered his position, as a letter by Pope Gregory the Great which congratulates him on returning to the emperor's favour testifies. The Pope's letter also testifies that by this time, Priscus had been given the Empire's supreme honorary rank, that of patrikios.

Map of the northern Balkans during the 6th century.

In spring 593, Priscus was re-appointed in command as commander of the cavalry in Thrace, with Gentzon leading the infantry. Priscus, as the more senior of the two, also held overall command. Both generals marched to Dorostolon on the Danube, and campaigned with success against the Slavic tribes preparing to cross the river under their leaders Ardagastus and Musocius. Crossing the river, both Slavic hosts were annihilated in surprise night attacks. At the same time, however, Priscus reportedly quarrelled with his men over the distribution of the booty captured, and especially the considerable portion Priscus allocated to the imperial family. The soldiers were eventually placated, and the booty sent back to the capital with an escort. Maurice also sent orders for the army to winter north of the river, but this caused great resentment and unrest amongst the soldiers. Priscus chose to disobey the emperor's order and crossed again with his army to winter in the southern bank. In the autumn of 593, he was replaced by Maurice with his own brother Peter. Before the latter could assume command, however, Priscus arranged for a truce with the khagan, to whom he returned all Avar captives, some 5,000 in number, a fact for which he was criticized by Maurice.

In late 594, however, after Peter was heavily defeated by the Slavs, Priscus was again appointed to command as magister militum of Thrace, a post he proceeded to hold continuously for several years. In 595, he marched up the Danube, crossing the river and marching along its northern bank to Novae, despite the khagan's protests. There, he learned that Singidunum had been captured by the Avars. He sailed his army to the city and, after failed face-to-face negotiations with the khagan, sent the taxiarches Guduin to recapture it. The Avars, having razed the city's walls, abandoned it at the approach of the Byzantine force. Next the Avars launched a raid against Dalmatia. Guduin was dispatched with 2,000 men to shadow them. He managed to ambush the Avar detachment carrying their booty, recovered it and sent it to Priscus. After these events, the khagan turned west to campaign against the Bavarians and the Franks, leaving the Byzantine territories quiet for a period of a year and a half, until the summer of 597. Nevertheless, Priscus and his army remained on watch along the Danube border.

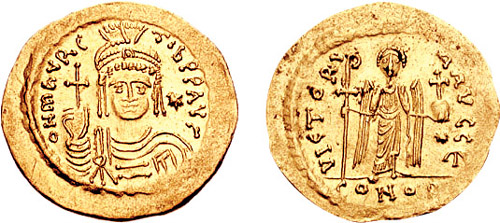
Gold solidus of Emperor Maurice (r. 582–602).

When the Avars resumed their operations with a large invasion in autumn 597, they appear to have caught Priscus, who was probably operating with his army at the eastern Stara Planina, off guard. They advanced quickly, and even managed to bottle up and besiege Priscus and his men at the port of Tomi, until the approach of a freshly raised army under Comentiolus forced them to abandon the siege on Easter day, 30 March 598. Priscus, however, remained strangely inactive, and Comentiolus's inexperienced army was routed in battle. The Avars then advanced south into Thrace, forcing Maurice to garrison the Anastasian Wall to prevent an attack on Constantinople. The Avar army, however, was decimated by a plague, and a treaty was quickly concluded, whereby the Avars retreated beyond the Danube in exchange for an increased annual tribute of 120,000 solidi. The Byzantines used the time to regroup their forces, and in the summer of 599, two armies under Priscus and Comentiolus headed west along the Danube. At Viminacium, Comentiolus fell ill and Priscus assumed sole command of the campaign. His army crossed the river, and fought three successive battles over ten days. These battles were won by the Byzantines, who, according to the account of Theophylact Simocatta, killed 28,000 barbarians in total, including some of the sons of the khagan. Priscus pursued the fleeing khagan and invaded the Avar homeland in Pannonia. There, a fourth battle was fought near the river Tisa, which was also won by the Byzantines. On the very next day, Priscus dispatched a reconnaissance force across the river, which attacked three Gepid settlements by surprise. According to Simocatta, 30,000 were killed and many were taken captive. Nineteen days later, another great battle was fought by the Tisza, which ended in a decisive Byzantine victory: the Avars and especially their Slavic allies suffered greatly, and Priscus took 3,000 Avars, 8,000 Slavs, and 6,200 other barbarians captive, who were sent south as slaves. Maurice, who had not yet realized the extent of his army's victory, ordered their release as a gesture of goodwill to the khagan. Nevertheless, Priscus's campaign was a remarkable act of aggressive defence. In the words of Michael Whitby, the main modern expert on Maurice's reign, it was "without parallel in the sixth century" for the Danube frontier, and which essentially decided the war for Byzantium.

After this success, which secured the Balkans, Maurice intended to consolidate Roman control by bringing in Armenian settlers who would be given land in exchange for military service. To this end, Priscus was sent to Armenia to recruit men and their families. His mission there, however, was interrupted by a large-scale military revolt that brought about the downfall of Maurice. In 602, Maurice again ordered his troops on the Danube frontier to winter north of the river. Again, this provoked widespread discontent, and when Peter, who had replaced Priscus, refused to bow down and rescind the order, an outright mutiny broke out. The army chose the officer Phocas as its new leader and marched down to Constantinople. Without any credible military forces of his own, Maurice had to flee, but was captured with his family and executed by Phocas, who now became emperor.

=== Under Phocas ===
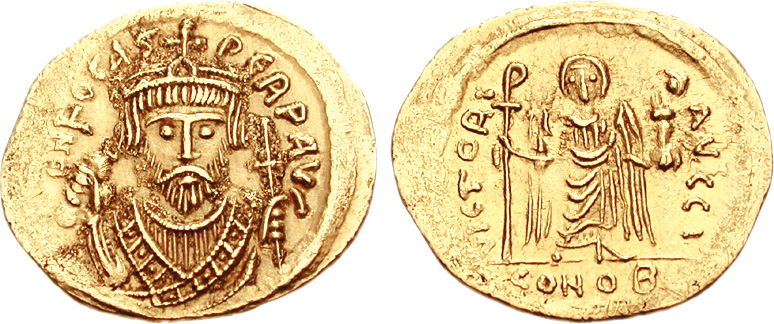
Gold solidus of Emperor Phocas (r. 602–610).

Due to his absence from Constantinople at the time of Phocas's takeover, and because he retained a large measure of support within the soldiery, Priscus was the only one of Maurice's senior generals who was retained by the new regime, whereas Comentiolus and Peter were executed and Philippicus was banished to a monastery. A possible explanation for this comes from the later historian Paul the Deacon, who records, possibly based on early 7th-century sources, that Phocas had once served as an equerry under Priscus. At any rate, Priscus was soon counted among the main supporters of the new regime. In the winter of 602/603, he was made comes excubitorum, commander of the imperial bodyguard. In 606 or 607, he also married Phocas's daughter, Domentzia, becoming the effective heir-apparent to the sonless ruler. In the games celebrated at the Hippodrome to honor the event, however, Phocas reacted violently when he saw portraits of Priscus and Domentzia carried alongside his by the citizens. From this moment on, the chroniclers report, Priscus turned against Phocas.

Phocas's rule lacked legitimacy and quickly came to be resented by the populace and the elites of the Byzantine Empire. What prestige he had further eroded when the Persian shah Khosrau II (r. 590–628) declared war, and when the Byzantine forces began to suffer their first defeats. According to a later tradition, Priscus sent a letter to the Exarch of Africa, Heraclius the Elder, urging him to revolt. This is probably a later invention, but if true, it would indicate the level of dissent even within Constantinople. Whatever the truth of the matter, in 608 Africa rose in revolt, and the Exarch's son, Heraclius the Younger, was dispatched against Constantinople at the head of a fleet. Unopposed by Phocas's forces, he landed at the suburb of Hebdomon on October 3 and marched to the capital, where pro-Heraclian riots had broken out. At this juncture, Priscus pretended to be ill, and withdrew to his mansion at the Boraïdou quarter, where he assembled the excubitores and his own retainers (bucellarii), thus depriving Phocas of his main source of armed support. He is also recorded by John of Nikiu to have safeguarded the women of Heraclius's family from retribution by Phocas.

=== Under Heraclius ===
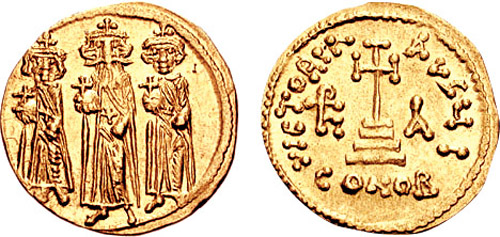
Gold solidus of Emperor Heraclius (r. 610–641).

After Phocas's fall, Heraclius became emperor of Byzantium. The Patriarch Nikephoros claims in his Short History that the crown was first offered to Priscus, who refused it. As commander of the excubitores, a protopatrikios (first among the patrician order) and one of the few senior and influential officials with ties to past regimes, Priscus represented a potential threat to Heraclius. Nevertheless, facing a critical situation in the East, where the Persians had overrun much territory and were raiding Anatolia, Heraclius appointed Priscus in command of the Anatolian army in the autumn of 611. The Persian general Shahin captured Caesarea in Cappadocia, only to be blockaded and besieged there by Priscus. Heraclius himself decided to visit the army camp at Caesarea during winter, but Priscus refused to meet him, on the pretext of an illness. This snub alienated Heraclius from his general, and when Shahin and his army managed to break out and escape in summer, Priscus was recalled to Constantinople, ostensibly to become godfather to the Byzantine emperor's son, Heraclius Constantine. At the capital, he was removed from his post as comes excubitorum, which went to Heraclius's cousin Nicetas, while command in Anatolia went to the other surviving general of Maurice, Philippicus, brought out of retirement. Priscus was brought before the Byzantine Senate and accused by Heraclius of treason. In the end, he was tonsured as a monk on 5 December 612 and confined in the Monastery of the Chora, where he died in 613.

== Assessment ==
Priscus comes across as an able and versatile military leader. In many instances, his operations against the Slavs resemble the prescriptions of the most influential Byzantine military manual, the Strategikon, ascribed to Emperor Maurice. Despite his reputation as a strict disciplinarian and his aloof stance which led to the mutiny of 588, in later campaigns he showed ability in dealing with the soldiers and calming their discontent. This cleverness was also employed against the Avar khagan. For instance, during the siege of Tomi in 598, Priscus managed to persuade the Avars to supply the Byzantine army, which was in fact close to starvation, with grain. As the scholar Walter Kaegi comments, Priscus's policy in defending the Danube frontier consisted in keeping the peace with the khagan "by sly negotiations", allowing him focus his efforts against the Slavs raiding imperial territory.

The main Byzantine source for the period, Theophylact Simocatta, displays a marked bias in favour of Priscus, especially in its account of the Balkan campaigns, where the other generals are denigrated and made to appear incompetent, with their achievements regularly belittled while Priscus's successes are extolled and his defeats glossed over. This may be due to the fact that for this period, Simocatta relied on a semi-official "campaign log" compiled during the years of Emperor Phocas, when Priscus was pre-eminent while most of his rivals were either executed or in exile.

== Sources ==
- Curta, Florin (2001). The Making of the Slavs: History and Archaeology of the Lower Danube Region, c. 500–700. Cambridge: Cambridge University Press. ISBN 9781139428880.
- Greatrex, Geoffrey; Lieu, Samuel N. C., eds. (2002). The Roman Eastern Frontier and the Persian Wars, Part II, 363–630 AD: A Narrative Sourcebook. New York and London: Routledge (Taylor & Francis). ISBN 0-415-14687-9.
- Kaegi, Walter Emil (1991). "Priskos". In Kazhdan, Alexander (ed.). The Oxford Dictionary of Byzantium. Oxford and New York: Oxford University Press. pp. 1721–1722. ISBN 0-19-504652-8.
- Kaegi, Walter Emil (2003). Heraclius: Emperor of Byzantium. Cambridge, United Kingdom: Cambridge University Press. ISBN 0-521-81459-6.
- Martindale, John R., ed. (1992). The Prosopography of the Later Roman Empire: Volume III, AD 527–641. Cambridge: Cambridge University Press. ISBN 0-521-20160-8.
- Treadgold, Warren (1997). A History of the Byzantine State and Society. Stanford, California: Stanford University Press. ISBN 0-8047-2630-2.
- Whitby, Michael; Whitby, Mary, eds. (1986). The History of Theophylact Simocatta. Oxford: Clarendon Press. ISBN 978-0-19-822799-1.
- Whitby, Michael (1988). The Emperor Maurice and his Historian – Theophylact Simocatta on Persian and Balkan Warfare. Oxford: Oxford University Press. ISBN 0-19-822945-3.
