= Comentiolus (brother of Phocas) =

Brother of Byzantine emperor Phocas)

Comentiolus (Greek: Κομεντίολος, romanized: Komentíolos; died 610/611) was the brother of the Eastern Roman emperor Phocas (r. 602–610).

== Life ==
Nothing is known of his early life except that he was the son of Domentzia, along with Phocas and the later magister officiorum Domentziolus. Raised by Phocas to the rank of patricius and the post of magister militum, he was in charge of the Byzantine Empire's eastern army facing the Sassanid Persians when Phocas was overthrown and executed by Heraclius (r. 610–641) in 610.

Comentiolus refused to acknowledge Heraclius's accession, and, bringing back the troops to winter quarters at Ancyra, he planned to attack Constantinople and avenge the deaths of his brothers Phocas and Domentziolus. Heraclius pardoned his nephew, the son of Domentziolus (also named Domentziolus), and sent the respected former general Philippicus as an envoy. Comentiolus imprisoned Philippicus and threatened to have him executed, but was himself assassinated by the patricius Justin (late 610 or 611). The rebellion, and with it a serious threat to Heraclius's still shaky hold on power, died with him.

== Sources ==
- Martindale, John R., ed. (1992). The Prosopography of the Later Roman Empire: Volume III, AD 527–641. Cambridge: Cambridge University Press. ISBN 0-521-20160-8.
- Kaegi, Walter Emil (1981). Byzantine Military Unrest, 471–843: An Interpretation. Amsterdam: Adolf M. Hakkert. ISBN 90-256-0902-3.
