= Excubitors =

Byzantine imperial guards

- Active: c. 460 CE – c. 1081
- Country: Byzantine Empire
- Type: Imperial guard (mid-5th – 7th centuries), heavy cavalry (mid-8th – 11th centuries)
- Garrison/HQ: Constantinople (5th–8th centuries), Bithynia and Thrace (8th–11th centuries), provincial detachments at least in Longobardia and Hellas (10th–11th centuries)
- Engagements: Maurice's Balkan campaigns of 582-602 Heraclius' campaigns during the Byzantine–Sasanian War of 602–628, Abbasid invasion of Asia Minor (782), Battle of Marcellae, Battle of Pliska, Battle of Boulgarophygon, Battle of Acheloos, Battle of Azaz (1030), Battle of Dyrrhachium (1081)

Commanders
- Notable commanders: Justin I, Marcellus, Tiberius II Constantine, Maurice, Philippicus, Priscus, Nicetas, Valentinus, Michael II, Constantine Opos

The Excubitors (Latin: excubitores or excubiti, lit. 'those out of bed', i.e. 'sentinels'; (Note: In the Roman army, excubiae were guard posts and excubitores the guards stationed there.) transcribed into Greek as ἐξκουβίτορες or ἐξκούβιτοι, exkoubitores/exkoubitoi) were founded in c. 460 as an imperial guard-unit by the Roman emperor Leo I the Thracian. The 300-strong force, originally recruited from among the warlike mountain tribe of the Isaurians, replaced the older Scholae Palatinae as the main imperial bodyguards. The Excubitors remained an active military unit for the next two centuries, although, as imperial bodyguards, they did not often go on campaign. Their commander, the Count of the Excubitors (comes excubitorum, κόμης τῶν ἐξκουβίτων), soon acquired great influence. Justin I was able to use this position to rise to the throne in 518, and thereafter the Counts of the Excubitors were among the main political power-holders of their day; two more, Tiberius II Constantine and Maurice, rose to become emperors in the late 6th century.

In the later part of the 7th century the Excubitors appear to have morphed into a parade-ground formation, and they fade from the record as a corps. Individual seals of office suggest that the title of excubitor became an honorific dignity rather than an active military appointment during the early part of the 8th century. This changed c. 760, when the Emperor Constantine V reformed the corps into one of the élite tagmata – professional heavy-cavalry regiments that constituted the core of the Byzantine army of the middle-Byzantine period. Notable members of the regiment during this time include Saint Joannicius the Great (served c. 772 to 792), and Emperor Michael II the Amorian, who served as regimental commander, or Domestic of the Excubitors (δομέστικος τῶν ἐξκουβίτων), before rising to the throne in 820. The Excubitors fought in several campaigns during the following centuries, and are last attested in the disastrous Battle of Dyrrhachium in 1081 that destroyed the remnants of the middle-Byzantine army.

== History ==
=== Early period: Imperial bodyguard ===
The Excubitors were founded by Emperor Leo I (r. 457–474) in c. 460 and were recruited from among the sturdy and warlike Isaurians, as part of Leo's effort to counterbalance the influence of the magister militum Aspar and the large Germanic element in the East Roman army. Unlike the older palace regiments of the Scholae Palatinae, which were under the control of the magister officiorum and eventually degenerated to parade-ground formations, the Excubitors long remained a crack fighting force.

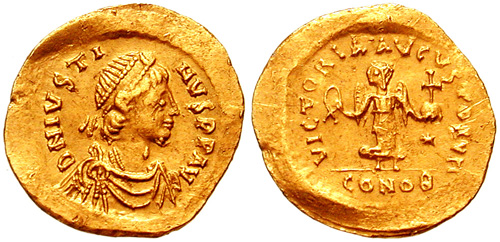
Tremissis of Emperor Justin I, the first commander of the Excubitors to rise to the throne.

The unit was headed by the count of the Excubitors (Latin: comes excubitorum; Ancient Greek: κόμης τῶν ἐξκουβίτων/ἐξκουβιτόρων, romanized: komēs tōn exkoubitōn/exkoubitorōn), who was entirely independent of all other officials and subordinated only to the emperor himself. By virtue of his proximity to the emperor, the count of the Excubitors became an official of great importance in the 6th and 7th centuries. This post, which can be traced up to c. 680, was usually held by close members of the imperial family, often virtual heirs apparent. Thus it was the support of his men that secured Justin I (r. 518–527), who held the post at the time of the death of Anastasius I (r. 491–518), his elevation to the throne. Similarly, Justin II (r. 565–578) relied on the support of the Excubitors for his unchallenged accession; their count, Tiberius, was a close friend who had been appointed to the post through Justin's intervention. Tiberius was to be the Emperor's right-hand man throughout his reign, eventually succeeding him as Tiberius II (r. 578–582). He too would be succeeded by his own comes excubitorum, Maurice (r. 582–602). Under Maurice, the post was held by his brother-in-law Philippicus, and under Phocas (r. 602–610) by Priscus. Another powerful occupant was Valentinus, who secured it during the power struggles that accompanied the regency of Empress-dowager Martina in 641, before deposing her and her son Heraklonas and installing Constans II (r. 641–668) as emperor. Valentinus dominated the new regime, but his attempt to become emperor himself in 644 ended in his being lynched by the mob.

By the late 6th century, the count of the Excubitors held the highest court ranks, of patrikios and vir gloriosissimus. Apart from their duties as commander of the Excubitors, holders of the office now also undertook other functions such as recruiting troops and interrogating suspected traitors. The count of the Excubitors was even sent to lead campaigns. The power that went with the position, and the intrigues of men like Priscus and the would-be usurper Valentinus, doomed the post to eventual decline during the latter half of the 7th century, although it is likely that the post continued in existence into the 8th century, until the corps was reorganized.

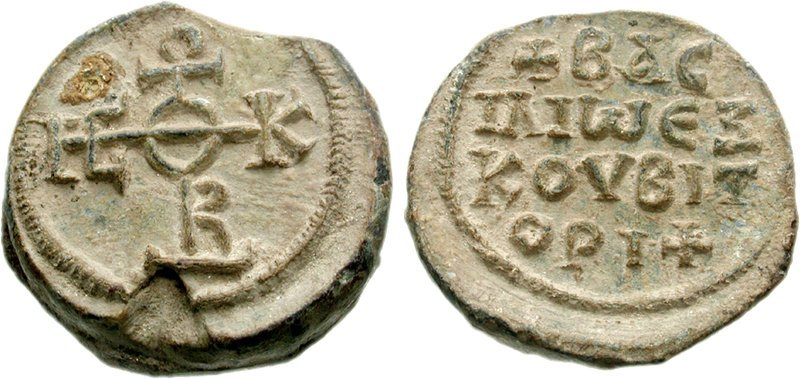
Lead seal of the Excubitor Basil (7th century)

The participation of the Excubitors in campaigns is well attested, such as in 598, when Emperor Maurice took them to defend the Anastasian Wall against the Avars. They served with Heraclius (r. 610–641) against the Sasanian Persians, and c. 650 some Excubitors appear as guards to Pope Martin I. During the later 7th century, like the Scholae before them, the Excubitors degenerated to a parade-ground unit that saw no active service. Indeed, it appears that during the 7th and early 8th centuries, the titles of excubitor and scribon were awarded as court dignities, paralleling the development of similar formerly military titles such as candidatus. This is evidenced by a large number of seals naming individual excubitors during this time, in stark contrast to the periods before and after, when the Excubitors are attested as an active military unit. Furthermore, in many of these seals, individual excubitores—as well as scribones—are shown to have conjointly held bureaucratic offices, while at least one seal is known of a certain George, who was both excubitor and a scholarius (a member of the Scholae).

=== Later period: Elite regiment ===
After being mentioned in a letter by Justinian II (r. 685–695, 705–711) to Pope John V in 687, the Excubitors as a corps disappear from the historical sources until they re-emerge, under a new commander, the domestic of the Excubitors (δομέστικος τῶν ἐξκουβίτων, domestikos tōn exkoubitōn) and in a new capacity, as one of the imperial tagmata, which comprised the elite professional central army established by Constantine V (r. 741–775) in c. 760. The tagmata were cavalry units, armed and equipped by the imperial arms factories to a higher standard than the provincial ('thematic') forces, likely including horse armour. As such the Excubitors were no longer a palace guard, but a unit actively engaged in military campaigns. At the same time, the tagmata, being loyal to the emperor's person, represented a counterbalance to the thematic armies of the provinces and constituted a powerful tool in implementing the iconoclastic policies pursued by Constantine V. Their original role as palace guardians was taken over by another, newly created tagma, that of the Vigla.

Nevertheless, the possibly first commander of the tagma, Strategios Podopagouros, was among the leaders of a failed plot against Constantine V's life in 765, and was executed after its discovery. This initiated a purge of the new units from suspected opponents of the Emperor's policies. By the 780s, following years of imperial favour and military victories under Constantine V and his son Leo IV the Khazar (r. 775–780), the tagmata had become firm adherents to the iconoclast cause. Within less than two months of Leo V's death in 780, Empress-regent Irene of Athens had to foil an attempt spearheaded by the Domestic of the Excubitors to place Constantine V's exiled second son, Nikephoros, on the throne, and in 785/86 Irene forcibly disarmed them and exiled some 1,500 tagmatic soldiers due to their resistance to the restoration of the icons.

At the same time, the tagmata were extensively employed in campaigns during this period: their participation is attested at least for Constantine V's 773 campaign against the Bulgars, and during the Abbasid invasion of Asia Minor in 782. Indeed, the historian John Haldon remarks that the retention of the tagmata by Irene, despite their iconoclastic bias, is testament to their effectiveness as a field force. The Scholae and the Excubitors nevertheless continued to play an active political role in the events of the following decades: in 792, they attempted to overthrow Irene's son, Constantine VI (r. 780–797), after the disastrous Battle of Marcellae against the Bulgars, and in 797, their support was crucial for Irene's overthrowing her own son and replacing him as sole ruler; and again, the two tagmata were crucial in the deposition of Irene herself in 802.

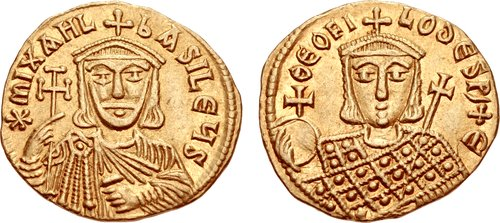
Solidus of Emperor Michael II and his son, Theophilos.

The Excubitors took part in the disastrous Pliska campaign in 811, when the Byzantine army was routed by Tsar Krum of Bulgaria (r. 803–814); the Domestic of the Excubitors fell in the field along with the other senior Byzantine generals, including Emperor Nikephoros I himself (r. 802–811). The most prominent domestic of the Excubitors of the period was Michael II the Amorian (r. 820–829), whose supporters overthrew Emperor Leo V the Armenian (r. 813–820) and raised him to the throne. The regiment also fought at the battles of Boulgarophygon in 896 and Acheloos in 917, both heavy defeats against the Bulgarians. In the expedition against the Emirate of Crete in 949, the Byzantine force included a contingent of over 700 Excubitors. In 958, the Excubitors participated in the repulsion of a Magyar raid.

The Excubitors took part in the failed Azaz campaign of 1030, where they were ambushed and dispersed by the Mirdasids, while their commander, the patrikios Leo Choirosphaktes, was taken captive. As with most of the Byzantine army, the tagmata of the capital atrophied during the mid-11th century, and many of them disappear in the turmoils of foreign invasion and civil wars that followed the destruction of the Byzantine field army in the Battle of Manzikert in 1071. The Excubitors are last attested in Anna Komnene's Alexiad, where they are recorded as participating at the Battle of Dyrrhachium against the Italo-Normans in 1081, under the command of Constantine Opos.

== Structure ==
=== Early period ===
The internal structure of the regiment during its first centuries is obscure. Unlike the Scholae, which comprised several sub-units garrisoned throughout Bithynia (and occasionally in Thrace) as well as Constantinople, the Excubitors were a small and elite unit that served in the imperial palace itself and was intended exclusively to protect the emperor. From their foundation and throughout the early period of their existence, the Excubitors numbered 300 men. Originally recruited exclusively from Isaurians, the unit was eventually opened up to other ethnicities, but it is unclear how the new recruits were chosen. Based on the retention of late antique ranks in the middle Byzantine period, the Excubitors appear to have been structured similarly to the Scholae. Their arms and equipment are unknown, other than that they are recorded as carrying maces. Since they were a bodyguard unit intended to serve in the palace, they were most likely infantry.

The presence of officers called scribones in the corps has been controversial: John B. Bury and A. H. M. Jones both suggested that they were a separate, although possibly related, unit. Based on the presence of the scribones among the ranks of the later, middle Byzantine incarnation of the Excubitors, however, it is thought that the scribones were the subaltern officers of the count of the Excubitors. The historian Warren Treadgold speculates that they fulfilled a role similar to the regular cavalry decurions, commanding troops of 30 men each, but the scribones also appear in charge of administrative matters such as handing out pay to the soldiers, as well as more sensitive tasks such as delivering letters, making arrests, and preparing expeditions.

=== Later period ===
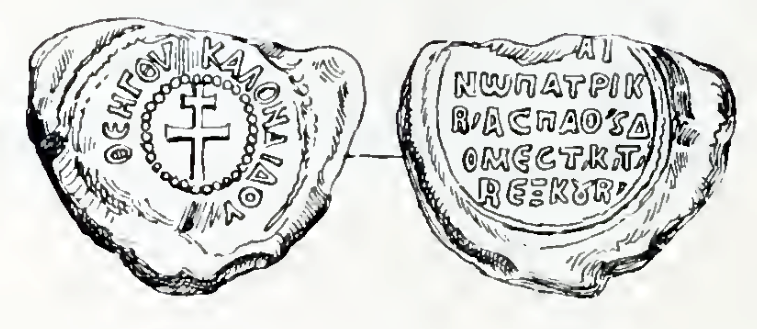
Seal of [Mart]inos (?), domestic of the Imperial Excubitors

In its later incarnation as a tagma, the regiment (often called collectively τὸ ἐξκούβιτον, to exkoubiton or τὰ ἐξκούβιτα, ta exkoubita) was structured along the same standardized lines followed by the other tagmata, with a few variations in the titles of its officers.

==== Commander ====
The regimental commander, the domestic of the Excubitors (often also shortened to "the Excubitor", ὁ ἐξκουβίτωρ/ἐξκούβιτος), is well attested in the various lists of offices in the 9th–10th centuries, where it is held in tandem with that of the chief (dēmokratēs) of the "suburban" (περατικοὶ, peratikoi) members of the racing faction (dēmos) of the Greens, which functioned as a militia for the defence of Constantinople, and of the regiment of the "Walls". The domestics were originally of strikingly low court rank (mere spatharioi, 'sword-bearers'), but they gradually rose to importance: while in the Taktikon Uspensky of c. 842 the domestic of the Excubitors came behind all the thematic commanders (stratēgoi) in order of precedence, in the Klētorologion of 899, the domestic is shown as superior to the stratēgoi of the European themes and even to the Eparch of Constantinople. At the same time, the court dignities they held rose to the much loftier ranks of prōtospatharios ('first sword-bearer') and even patrikios ('patrician').

The Escorial Taktikon, written c. 971/75, records the existence of a "Domestic of the Excubitors of the East" (δομέστικος τῶν ἐξκουβίτων τῆς ἀνατολῆς), and a "Domestic of the Excubitors of the West" (δομέστικος τῶν ἐξκουβίτων τῆς δύσεως), as well as a subaltern "Domestic of the Excubitors". This has led to the suggestion that, probably under Romanos II (r. 959–963), the regiment, like the senior Scholae, was split in two units, one for the West and one for the East, each headed by a respective domestic. However, unlike the Scholae, these designations no longer appear in any later source, and they may have been of brief existence. The subaltern domestic of the Excubitors may either by a copyist error, or, according to Vera von Falkenhausen, indicate a subordinate official in charge of Excubitors stationed in the provinces; indeed such provincial detachments are attested, albeit only for the themes of Longobardia in southern Italy and of Hellas in Greece.

==== Other officers ====
The fact that the unit did not partake in campaigns during the 7th century preserved it from the reforms that affected the field army during this period, so that the late antique terminology for its junior officers remained relatively intact. The domestic was assisted by a topotērētēs (τοποτηρητής, lit. 'placeholder', 'lieutenant') and a chartoularios (χαρτουλάριος, 'secretary'). The topotērētēs was of relatively low-to-middle court rank (originally stratōr, 'groom' or spatharios, later spatharokandidatos). He may have commanded provincial detachments of the regiment, and there may have been more than one topotērētai at the same time, for each of these detachments.

Based on a reference from the hagiography of St. Joannicius the Great (762–846), who was himself recruited into the regiment and served there until deserting it following the Battle of Marcellae, in 773 the regiment itself was divided into at least eighteen banda, probably each commanded by a skribōn (σκρίβων), showing the retention of the role of the earlier scribones as the main subaltern officers of the regiment. Each bandon was further divided into sub-units headed by a drakonarios (δρακονάριος, deriving from the late Roman draconarius). The post was originally that of a standard-bearer, but after Constantine V's reform of the unit into a tagma, the drakonarioi probably functioned as junior officers. The junior officers also included the skeuophoroi (σκευοφόροι, 'standard carriers'), signophoroi (σιγνοφόροι, i.e. signifers) and sinatores (σινάτορες, from the late Roman rank of senator, now much reduced in prominence). There were also the usual messengers (μανδάτορες, mandatores) under a prōtomandatōr, some of whom were also termed legatarioi (λεγατάριοι), possibly entrusted with police duties.

==== Strength ====
The size of the tagma of the Excubitors and its subdivisions can not be determined with certainty; as with the other tagmata, modern scholars are of differing opinions regarding its numerical strength. Drawing on the lists of officers and accounts of Arab geographers Ibn Khordadbeh and Qudamah, historian Warren Treadgold suggested an establishment strength of c. 4,000 men, which for the Scholae and the Excubitors rose to c. 6,000 with the division of the regiments in the mid-10th century. Other scholars, most prominently John Haldon, based on a more conservative reading of sources, have provided estimates of around 1,000 men for each tagma. For security reasons, both the Scholae and the Excubitors were scattered in garrisons in Thrace and Bithynia rather than being stationed within Constantinople, making it harder for them to be used in mounting a coup.

== Known commanders of the Excubitors ==
Name	Tenure	Notes
Counts of the Excubitors
Justin I	515–518	Count of the Excubitors under Emperor Anastasius I, before becoming emperor. As count of the Excubitors, he took part in the suppression of the rebellion of Vitalian, leading the imperial fleet against the rebel navy.
Priscus	529	A former secretary (notarius) of Justinian I, he became count of the Excubitors but fell foul of Empress Theodora and was banished to Cyzicus and later a monastery.
Theodore	535–536	As count of the Excubitors, he served with Solomon in North Africa, where he played a critical role in the Battle of Mount Bourgaon. He was murdered in Easter 536 in the mutiny led by Stotzas.
Marcellus	541–552	Count of the Excubitors, he is described by Procopius as an austere and incorruptible man, who took part in the discovery of the conspiracy of Artabanes. In 552, he was member of an embassy to Pope Vigilius.
Marinus	561–562	Count of the Excubitors, he was charged with suppressing racing faction violence in Constantinople, and in investigating the conspiracy to assassinate Emperor Justinian in November 562.
Tiberius II	565–574	He was appointed count of the Excubitors during the reign of Justinian I, and was a protégé of Justin II. In c. 570 he led the campaign against the Pannonian Avars around Sirmium and Thrace. When Justin II became insane, as the most influential member of the court he was named Caesar and de facto regent.
Maurice	574?–582?	A notarius of Tiberius, he was probably appointed count of the Excubitors as the latter's successor when Tiberius became Caesar. He likely held his post in tandem with the position of magister militum per Orientem (commander-in-chief of the East) against the Sasanian Empire, until he himself became Caesar in 582. By 577/78, he was also a patrikios.
Philippicus	582/584–603	The husband of Maurice's sister Gordia, he was made count of the Excubitors sometime early in Maurice's reign, and held it until he retired to a monastery in 603. He also served at the same time as magister militum per Orientem against the Sasanians.
Priscus	603?–612	Already a distinguished general and patrikios before being appointed as count of the Excubitors, shortly after Phocas came to power. In 607 he married Domentzia, daughter of Emperor Phocas, but conspired with Heraclius for the overthrow of Phocas. He led troops in Asia Minor against the Sasanians, but was dismissed and forced to retire as a monk by Heraclius in December 612.
Nicetas	612–613	A cousin of the Emperor Heraclius, he participated in the overthrow of Phocas and was named a patrikios. Named count of the Excubitors in succession to Priscus, he led Byzantine troops against the Sasanians around Antioch, before going to Egypt as governor.
Valentinus	6th/7th century	Patrikios and "Count of the Imperial Exkoubiton" (komēs tou basilikou exkoubitou), known only from his seal of office.
Valentinus	641	An Armenian aristocrat, he enforced the coronation of Constans II as co-emperor alongside Heraklonas, and was given the position of count of the Excubitors. From this post, he led campaigns against the Arabs, and may have been responsible for the overthrow of Heraklonas and his mother, Empress-regent Martina. Possibly identical to the previous.
Stephen	7th century	"Count of the Divine Exkoubiton" (komēs tou theiou exkoubitou), known only from his seal of office.
Domestics of the Excubitors
Sisinios	early 8th century	Patrikios, magistros, and domestic of the Excubitors, grandfather of Patriarch Tarasios of Constantinople.
Strategios Podopagouros	765	A spatharios (in one text variant patrikios) and domestic of the Excubitors (domestikos tōn ekskoubitōn [sic]), executed by Constantine V during his purge of iconophiles in 765.
Constantine	780	A spatharios of the vikarios and domestic of the Excubitors (domestikos tōn ekskoubitorōn [sic]), he participated in a conspiracy against Empress-regent Irene of Athens in favor of the Caesar Nikephoros, and finally was arrested and imprisoned in a monastery.
Niketas	750/800	Imperial prōtospatharios and domestic of the Excubitors, known only from his seal of office.
Arsaber	750/850	Imperial prōtospatharios and "Domestic of the Exkoubiton" (domestikos tou exkoubitou), known only from his seal of office.
Anonymous	811	"Domestic of the Exkoubiton" (domestikos tou ekskoubitou [sic]), he was killed at the Battle of Pliska.
Michael II	813–?	The future emperor Michael II was appointed to the post of exkoubitos by Leo V in 813, and held it for a number of years.
Anonymous	829/842	Exkoubitos and simultaneously dēmokratēs of the Greens, under Emperor Theophilos.
Constantine	c. 842	An Armenian, he commanded the tagma in 842.
Leo	869	Patrikios and domestic of the Excubitors, he is recorded among the attendants at the 869 Church council in Constantinople.
Ashot	896	An Armenian nobleman, he was regimental commander (exarchōn) and fell at the Battle of Boulgarophygon in 896.
Paul	9th century	Imperial prōtospatharios and domestic of the Excubitors, known only from his seal of office.
Sergios	9th century	Patrikios, imperial prōtospatharios and domestic of the Excubitors, known only from his seal of office.
Symbatios	850/900	Patrikios, imperial prōtospatharios and domestic of the Excubitors, known only from his seal of office. Possibly to be identified with Symbatios the Armenian (fl. 860s).
Theophilos	9th century	Imperial prōtospatharios and domestic of the Excubitors, known only from his seal of office.
Aetios	late 9th/early 10th century	Imperial prōtospatharios and domestic of the Excubitors, known only from his seal of office. Potentially identical with a namesake domestic of the Scholae, or a droungarios of the Vigla of the same name.
John Grapson	917	He commanded the regiment and was killed at the Battle of Acheloos in 917. His father Maroules had been Domestic of the tagma of the Hikanatoi. John Skylitzes describes him as a valiant and distinguished warrior.
Anonymous	949	Referred to simply as "the exkoubitor", he participated with over 700 men and his topotērētēs in the failed expedition to Crete in 949.
Pothos Argyros	c. 958/9	He is mentioned as being a patrikios and domestic of the Excubitors when he defeated a Magyar raid in the Balkans. Identified by some with a namesake domestic of the Scholae c. 922.
Peter	990	Referred to as an excubitus, he was murdered in southern Italy.
Makrotheodoros	997	Referred to as an excubitus, he was murdered at Oria in southern Italy.
Theodore	998	Mentioned in a deed from southern Italy, possibly identical with the previous.
John (?)	950/1050	Imperial prōtospatharios, epi tou Chrysotriklinou (uncertain reading) and domestic of the Excubitors of the West, known only from his seal of office.
Nikolitzes Kekaumenos	turn of 10th/11th century	The grandfather of the military writer Kekaumenos, who records him as domestic of the Excubitors of Hellas.
Leo Patianos	1017	An excubitus who was killed during the revolt of Melus of Bari in southern Italy.
Leo Choirosphaktes	1030	Commanded the Excubitors during Romanos III's failed campaign into northern Syria.
Constantine Opos	1081	Commanded the Excubitors during the Battle of Dyrrhachium against the Italo-Normans.
Martinos (possibly also Marianos or Adrianos)	9th/11th century	Patrikios, imperial prōtospatharios and "Domestic of the Imperial Excubitors" (domestikos tōn basilikōn exkoubitōn), known only from his seal of office.

== Sources ==
- Bury, J. B.; Philotheus (1911). The Imperial Administrative System of the Ninth Century (With a Revised Text of the Kletorologion of Philotheos). London: Oxford University Press.
- Birkenmeier, John W. (2002). The Development of the Komnenian Army: 1081–1180. Leiden: Brill Academic Publishers. ISBN 90-04-11710-5.
- Evans, James Allan Stewart (1996). The Age of Justinian: The Circumstances of Imperial Power. New York: Routledge. ISBN 0-415-02209-6.
- Haldon, John F. (1984). Byzantine Praetorians. An Administrative, Institutional and Social Survey of the Opsikion and Tagmata, c. 580-900. Bonn: Dr. Rudolf Habelt GmbH. ISBN 3-7749-2004-4.
- Haldon, John (1999). Warfare, State and Society in the Byzantine World, 565–1204. London: UCL Press. ISBN 1-85728-495-X.
- Kaegi, Walter Emil (1981). Byzantine Military Unrest, 471–843: An Interpretation. Amsterdam: Adolf M. Hakkert. ISBN 90-256-0902-3.
- Kazhdan, Alexander (1991). "Domestikos ton exkoubiton". In Kazhdan, Alexander (ed.). The Oxford Dictionary of Byzantium. Oxford and New York: Oxford University Press. pp. 646–647. ISBN 0-19-504652-8.
- Kühn, Hans-Joachim (1991). Die byzantinische Armee im 10. und 11. Jahrhundert: Studien zur Organisation der Tagmata (in German). Vienna: Fassbaender Verlag. ISBN 3-9005-38-23-9.
- Lilie, Ralph-Johannes; Ludwig, Claudia; Pratsch, Thomas; Zielke, Beate (2013). Prosopographie der mittelbyzantinischen Zeit Online. Berlin-Brandenburgische Akademie der Wissenschaften. Nach Vorarbeiten F. Winkelmanns erstellt (in German). Berlin and Boston: De Gruyter.
- Martindale, John R., ed. (1980). The Prosopography of the Later Roman Empire: Volume II, AD 395–527. Cambridge: Cambridge University Press. ISBN 0-521-20159-4.
- Martindale, John R., ed. (1992). The Prosopography of the Later Roman Empire: Volume III, AD 527–641. Cambridge: Cambridge University Press. ISBN 0-521-20160-8.
- Ng, Michael (2012). "Excubiae". The Encyclopedia of Ancient History. Wiley. doi:10.1002/9781444338386.wbeah19072. ISBN 978-1-4051-7935-5.
- Treadgold, Warren (1995). Byzantium and Its Army, 284–1081. Stanford, California: Stanford University Press. ISBN 0-8047-3163-2.
- Treadgold, Warren (1997). A History of the Byzantine State and Society. Stanford, California: Stanford University Press. ISBN 0-8047-2630-2.
- Whitby, Michael (2000). "The Army, c. 420–602". In Cameron, Averil; Ward-Perkins, Bryan; Whitby, Michael (eds.). The Cambridge Ancient History, Volume XIV: Late Antiquity: Empire and Successors, A.D. 425–600. Cambridge: Cambridge University Press. pp. 288–314. ISBN 978-0-5213-2591-2.
- Whittow, Mark (1996). The Making of Byzantium, 600–1025. Berkeley and Los Angeles, California: University of California Press. ISBN 978-0-520-20496-6.
- Wortley, John, ed. (2010). John Skylitzes: A Synopsis of Byzantine History, 811–1057. Cambridge: Cambridge University Press. ISBN 978-0-521-76705-7.
