= Domentziolus (brother of Phocas) =

Domentziolus (Greek: Δομεντ[ζ]ίολος) or Domnitziolus (Δομνιτζίολος) was a brother of the Byzantine emperor Phocas (r. 602–610).

== Life ==
Phocas and his family were likely of Thraco-Roman origin. Phocas and Domentziolus' mother was named Domentzia. A third brother is known, named Comentiolus.

In 603, Phocas appointed Domentziolus as his magister officiorum, a post he continued to hold throughout Phocas' reign. In 610, facing the revolt of Heraclius, Domentziolus was sent by Phocas to man the Anastasian Wall. When he heard however that Heraclius' fleet had reached Abydos, he fled to Constantinople. After the overthrow and execution of Phocas, he too was executed on the orders of Heraclius, but his apparent son, the general and curopalates Domentziolus, was spared at the intercession of Theodore of Syceon.

== Sources ==
- Bury, John Bagnell (2009) [1889]. History of the Later Roman Empire from Arcadius to Irene. Vol. II. Cosimo, Inc. ISBN 978-1-60520-405-5.
- Martindale, John R., ed. (1992). The Prosopography of the Later Roman Empire: Volume III, AD 527–641. Cambridge: Cambridge University Press. ISBN 0-521-20160-8.
