= Tiberius (son of Maurice) =

Byzantine noble

- Died: 27 November 602; Harbor of Eutropius, Chalcedon (modern-day Kadıköy, Istanbul, Turkey)
- Burial place: Monastery of Saint Mamas (modern-day Istanbul, Turkey)
- Parents: Maurice (father); Constantina (mother)

Tiberius (Greek: Τιβέριος; died 27 November 602) was the second son of Byzantine Emperor Maurice and his wife Constantina. His father intended him to inherit Italy and the western islands, centered in Rome; however, this did not come to fruition as his father was overthrown by the new Emperor Phocas, who had him and his father executed, along with his younger brothers, in the Harbor of Eutropius, Chalcedon.

== Early life and family ==
Tiberius was the second son of Byzantine Emperor Maurice, and Constantina. He was named in honor of Emperor Tiberius II, his maternal grandfather. He had an older brother, Theodosius, four younger brothers, Peter, Paul, Justin, and Justinian, and three sisters, Anastasia, Theoctiste, and Cleopatra. Maurice was not only the first Byzantine emperor since Theodosius I to produce a son, but his and Constantina's ability to produce numerous children was the subject of popular jokes.

Maurice had served as magister militum per Orientem, the commander of Byzantine forces in the East, securing decisive victories over the Sassanian Empire. The ruling Byzantine Emperor, Tiberius II, weakened by illness, named Maurice one of his two heirs, alongside Germanus, planning to divide the empire in two, giving Maurice the Eastern half. However, Germanus declined, and therefore, on 13 August 582, Maurice was married to Constantina and declared emperor. Tiberius II died the following day, and Maurice became sole emperor.

== Later life ==
According to his father's will, written in 597 when he was suffering from severe illness, Maurice intended for Tiberius to rule Italy and the western islands, centered in Rome, rather than Ravenna, with Theodosius ruling in the East, centered in Constantinople. Theophylact Simocatta, a contemporary source, states that the remainder of the empire would be split by Maurice's younger sons, and Byzantist J. B. Bury suggests one would rule North Africa, and the other Illyricum, including Greece, with Domitian of Melitene as their guardian. Historian Henning Börm suggests that in this arrangement, Theodosius would serve as senior augustus, Tiberius as junior augustus, and the younger brothers as caesars.

In 602 Maurice ordered the Byzantine army to winter beyond the Danube, causing troops exhausted by warfare against the Slavs to rise up, and declare Phocas their leader. The troops demanded Maurice abdicate in favor of Theodosius or General Germanus. On 22 November 602, facing riots in Constantinople led by the Green faction, Maurice and his family boarded a warship bound for Nicomedia. Theodosius may have been at that time in the Sasanian Empire, on a diplomatic mission, or, according to some sources, was later sent by Maurice to request aid from the Sassanian Emperor Khosrow II.

Phocas was crowned emperor the next day, on the 23rd, after he arrived in the capital. After surviving a storm, Tiberius and his family landed at Saint Autonomos, near Praenetus, 45 miles (72 km) from Constantinople, but were forced to stay there due to Maurice's arthritis, which left him bed-ridden. They were captured by Lilios, an officer of Phocas, and brought to the Harbor of Eutropius at Chalcedon, where on 27 November 602, Tiberius and his four younger brothers were put to death, followed by Maurice himself. Their remains were gathered by Gordia, Tiberius' aunt, and interred at the Monastery of Saint Mamas, which she had founded. Theodosius was subsequently captured and executed when he returned, while Constantina and her daughters were taken under the protection of Cyriacus II, the Patriarch of Constantinople.
