= Alexander (supporter of Phocas) =

- Ἀλέξανδρος
- Died: 602
- Occupation: Byzantine Rebel
- Known for: Leading supporter of emperor Phocas
- Notable work: Execution of co-emperor Theodosius

Alexander (Greek: Ἀλέξανδρος; died 602) was a Byzantine rebel against emperor Maurice (r. 582–602) and leading supporter of emperor Phocas (r. 602–610). He is better known for executing the co-emperor Theodosius. The main source about him is Theophylact Simocatta.

== Biography ==
Alexander is first mentioned in a fragment of John of Antioch. The fragment has Alexander and Lilius being sent as envoys to emperor Maurice (r. 582–602) in Constantinople. They were apparently representatives of Phocas and the "rebellious army of Thrace", making them rebels themselves.

The Chronicon Paschale gives the chronological account of the rise of Phocas and Leontia to the throne. On 23 November 602, Phocas was crowned emperor by his troops outside the capital. On 25 November, Phocas entered Constantinople and was accepted as emperor by the general populace. He proclaimed chariot races in honor of his elevation and had Leontia escorted to the city as his new Empress.

According to the chronicle of Theophanes the Confessor, Leontia was officially crowned an Augusta on 27 November. According to the history of Theophylact Simocatta, the new imperial couple led a procession through the city as per custom. The festive occasion was marked with renewed conflicts between the Blues and Greens, the two major chariot racing clubs. Theophylact Simocatta first mentions Alexander on this occasion. Alexander was reportedly sent by Phocas to calm down the rival factions. He only managed to enrage the Blues, by quarreling with their demarch Cosmas. He pushed aside Cosmas with sufficient force to make him fall. The insulted Blues started shouting ominous words of rebellion: "Begone! understand the situation, Maurice is not yet dead!" The Blues thus questioned the legitimacy of the new Emperor. Phocas reacted by ordering the execution of Maurice and his sons, which took place before the end of the day.

Alexander's next task was the execution of the co-emperor Theodosius and Constantine Lardys. They were respectively the last surviving son of Maurice and his companion. He seems to have performed the killings, but neglected another significant part of the job. The head of Theodosius had to be brought back for display. Alexander did not return with the head, leaving it uncertain whether Theodosius was actually dead. Contemporary rumours reported that Alexander had been bribed by Germanus, father-in-law of Theodosius, to spare the life of the young man. While Theophylact denied any truth to this rumour, Phocas apparently did not. He had Alexander executed.

An alternative account of Alexander's death is given by John of Nikiû. "And certain persons accused Alexander, who was one of the rulers —a discreet man and beloved by all the inhabitants of Constantinople, and they said to Phocas : 'This Alexander is desirous of slaying thee and becoming emperor in thy stead.' Now this Alexander had married a daughter of Maurice. And thereupon Phocas had Alexander and Kudis (= Elpidius?) and other officers thrown into chains and sent to the city of Alexandria to be imprisoned there. Shortly after, Phocas sent orders to Justin the governor of Alexandria to execute Alexander and his companions." It is probable that John accidentally identified Alexander with Germanus. The details seem to match Germanus better than Alexander.

== Sources ==
- Bury, John Bagnell (1889), A History of the Later Roman Empire from Arcadius to Irene, Vol. II, MacMillan & Co., ISBN 1-60520-405-6
- Charles, Robert H. (2007) [1916]. The Chronicle of John, Bishop of Nikiu: Translated from Zotenberg's Ethiopic Text. Merchantville, NJ: Evolution Publishing. ISBN 9781889758879.
- Martindale, John R.; Jones, A.H.M.; Morris, John (1992), The Prosopography of the Later Roman Empire, Volume III: AD 527–641, Cambridge University Press, ISBN 0-521-20160-8
- Olster, David Michael (1993), The politics of usurpation in the seventh century: rhetoric and revolution in Byzantium, A.M. Hakkert
- Ostrogorsky, George (1956). History of the Byzantine State. Oxford: Basil Blackwell.
