= Theodosius (son of Maurice) =

Byzantine co-emperor from 590 to 602

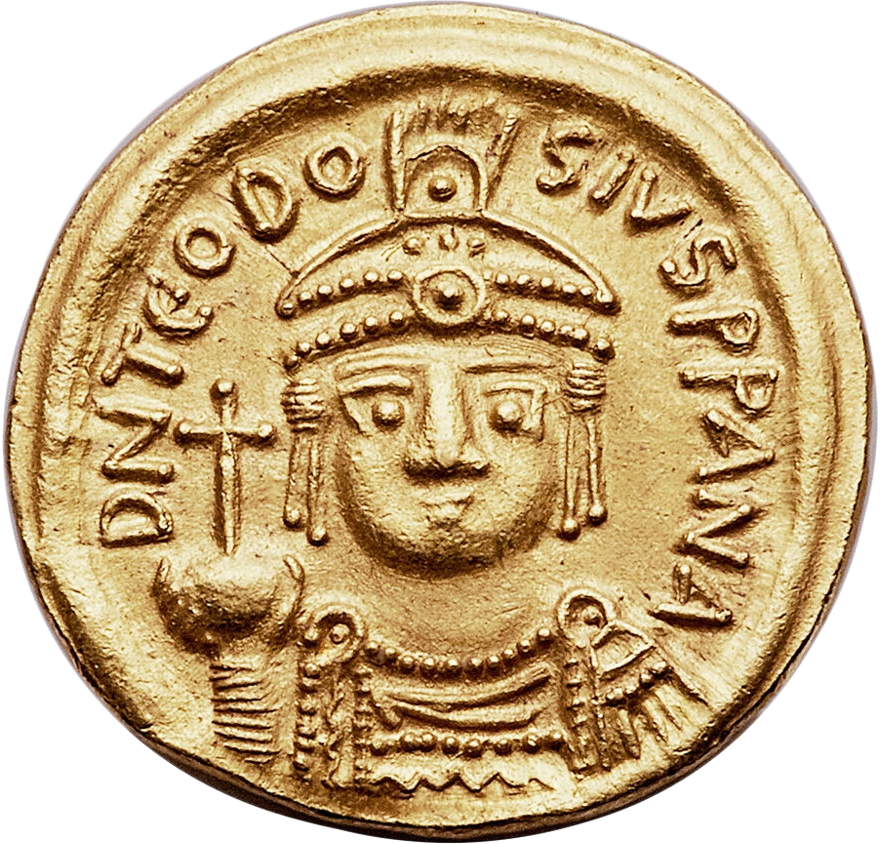
- Gold solidus of Theodosius

Eastern Roman emperor
- Augustus: 26 March 590 – 27 November 602
- Predecessor: Maurice
- Successor: Phocas
- Caesar: c. 587 – 26 March 590
- Born: 4 August 583
- Died: After 27 November 602 (aged 19); Chalcedon, Bithynia
- Burial: Saint Mamas Monastery, Constantinople
- Spouse: Daughter of Germanus
Regnal name
- Imperator Caesar Flavius Theodosius Augustus
- Dynasty: Justinian
- Father: Maurice
- Mother: Constantina
- Religion: Chalcedonian Christianity

Saint Theodosius the Emperor with family

Holy and Right-Believing Emperor of the Romans
- Venerated in: Eastern Orthodoxy
- Major shrine: Saint Mamas Monastery
- Feast: 28 November
- Attributes: Imperial attire

Theodosius (Latin: Theodosius, Ancient Greek: Θεοδόσιος, romanized: Theodósios; 4 August 583 – shortly after 27 November 602) was the eldest son of Eastern Roman emperor Maurice (r. 582–602) and was co-emperor from 590 until his deposition and execution during a military revolt. Along with his father-in-law Germanus, he was briefly proposed as successor to Maurice by the troops, but the army eventually favoured Phocas instead. Sent in an abortive mission to secure aid from Sassanid Persia by his father, Theodosius was said to have been captured and executed by Phocas's supporters a few days after Maurice. Nevertheless, rumours spread that he had survived the execution, and became popular to the extent that a man who purported to be Theodosius was entertained by the Persians as a pretext for launching a war against Byzantium. There is debate over whether this man was an imposter or genuinely Theodosius.

== Biography ==
Theodosius was the first child of Maurice and his wife, the augusta Constantina. He was born on 4 August 583 (according to the contemporary John of Ephesus and other chroniclers) or 585 (according to the later histories of Theophanes the Confessor and Kedrenos). He was the first son to be born to a reigning emperor since the birth of Theodosius II in 401, and was accordingly named after him. The papal envoy, or apocrisiarius, to Constantinople, the future Pope Gregory the Great, acted as his godfather. The scholar Evagrius Scholasticus composed a work celebrating Theodosius' birth, for which he was rewarded by Maurice with the rank of consul.

A few years after his birth, possibly in 587, Theodosius was raised to the rank of caesar and thus became his father's heir-apparent. Three years later, on 26 March 590, he was publicly proclaimed as co-emperor.

In late 601 or early February 602, Maurice married Theodosius to a daughter of the patrician Germanus, a leading member of the Senate. (Note: Germanus's identity is unclear. He has been sometimes identified with the identically named, posthumous son (b. 550/551) of the magister militum Germanus (d. 550) and Matasuntha, or an unnamed son of the general Justinian, the second son of the senior Germanus. Though not conclusive, many historians also equate the patrician Germanus with the caesar Germanus, a son-in-law of Tiberius II Constantine who became caesar alongside Maurice but refused the throne.) The historian Theophylact Simocatta, the major chronicler of Maurice's reign, also records that on 2 February 602, Germanus saved Theodosius from harm during food riots in Constantinople.

Later in the same year, during the revolt of the Danubian armies in autumn, Theodosius and his father-in-law were hunting in the outskirts of Constantinople. There they received a letter from the mutinous troops, in which they demanded Maurice's resignation, a redress of their grievances, and offered the crown to either of the two. They presented the letter to Maurice, who rejected the army's demands. The emperor however began suspecting Germanus of playing a part in the revolt. Theodosius promptly informed his father-in-law of this and advised him to hide, and on November 21, Germanus fled first to a local church and then to the Hagia Sophia, seeking sanctuary from the Byzantine emperor's emissaries. When the attempt to guide Germanus away from the precinct via Stephen, Theodosius' eunuch tutor, failed, Maurice beat Theodosius with a staff, blaming him for communicating the secret to Germanus. Historian Michael Whitby suggests that Theodosius' marriage, which intended to unite Maurice and Germanus' family, instead gave reason for Maurice to suspect his own son.

In the middle of the night of November 22, as the crowd rioted and turned against Maurice, the emperor and his family and closest associates fled the capital before the advancing rebel army under Phocas, and crossed over to Chalcedon. From there, Theodosius was dispatched along with the praetorian prefect Constantine Lardys to seek the aid of Khosrau II, the ruler of Sassanid Persia. However, when he reached Nicaea, Maurice recalled him. On his return Theodosius fell into the hands of Phocas' men and was executed at Chalcedon. His father and younger brothers had been executed a few days earlier on November 27.

== Theory of survival and pseudo-Theodosius ==
Subsequently, rumours of Theodosius's survival spread far and wide. It was alleged that his father-in-law Germanus had bribed his executioner, a leading Phocas supporter named Alexander, to spare his life. In this story, Theodosius then fled, eventually reaching Lazica, where he died. Theophylact Simocatta reports that he thoroughly investigated these rumours and found them false. Modern historian Paul Speck, however, argues that doubts about the genuineness of Theodosius only began to be expressed late in the reign of Heraclius.

Upon hearing the stories of Theodosius' survival around 605, Constantina and Germanus secretly exchanged messages. Constantina's maid betrayed them to Phocas, who then executed them and their daughters. The general Narses, who rose against Phocas in Mesopotamia, exploited the rumours about Theodosius. He produced a man claiming to be Theodosius and then presented him to Khosrau II. The Persian ruler, in turn, used him as a pretext for his own invasion of Byzantium, claiming that it was done in order to avenge the murder of Maurice and his family and place the "rightful" heir Theodosius on the throne. According to the Khuzistan Chronicle, he even had Theodosius re-crowned as Roman emperor by the Nestorian patriarch Sabrisho I in a ceremony in Ctesiphon. In the Armenian campaign of 606–7, the pretender accompanied the commander Ashtat Yeztayar. His presence convinced the garrison of Theodosiopolis (Erzurum) to surrender.

James Howard-Johnston disputes the identification of this Theodosius as a pretender, arguing that such claims were Roman propaganda and that it is unlikely that both the people of Edessa in 603 and the notables of Theodosiopolis who met him in 608 would have been deceived by an impostor. The authenticity of this Theodosius is also supported by Booth and Bonner.

== Coinage ==
Theodosius does not appear on most of the regular coinage of Maurice's reign, with just a few exceptions: the copper nummi of the Cherson mint, which show him along with his father and mother, a special silver siliqua issue (apparently cut in 591/592 to celebrate his proclamation as co-emperor) from the Carthage mint. There is one surviving gold solidus that depicts him in his imperial regalia, also from the Carthage mint.
