= Byzantine Empire under the Justinian dynasty =

Period of Byzantine history from 518 to 602

Byzantine Empire: Imperium Romanum (Latin); Βασιλεία Ῥωμαίων (Ancient Greek)
- 518–602
- Chi Rho (see Byzantine insignia)

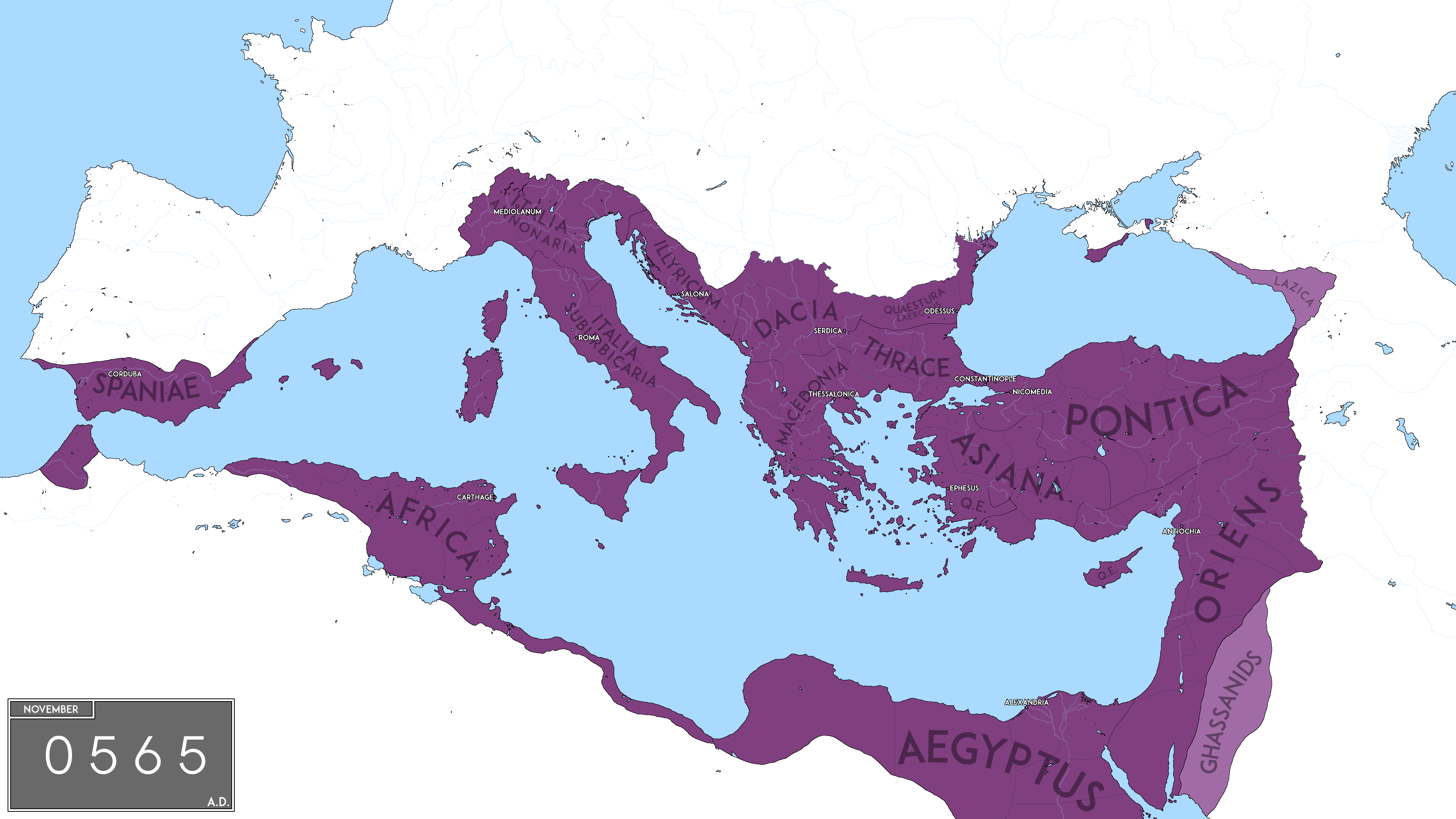
- The Byzantine Empire at its greatest extent since the fall of the Western Roman Empire, under Justinian I in 565 AD.
- Capital: Constantinople
- Common languages: Latin, Greek
- Government: Monarchy
- Emperor
  - 518–527: Justin I
  - 527–565: Justinian I
  - 565–574: Justin II
  - 574–582: Tiberius II
  - 582–602: Maurice
- History
  - Accession of Justin I: 10 July 518
  - Deposition of Maurice: 27 November 602
Preceded by
Byzantine Empire under the Leonid dynasty
Ostrogothic Kingdom
Visigothic Kingdom
Vandal Kingdom
Succeeded by
Byzantine Empire under the Heraclian dynasty
Kingdom of the Lombards
Visigothic Kingdom
Pannonian Avars

The Byzantine Empire under the Justinian dynasty began in 518 AD with the accession of Justin I. Under the Justinian dynasty, particularly the reign of Justinian I, the empire reached its greatest territorial extent (around 2.7 million km²) since the fall of its Western counterpart, reincorporating North Africa, southern Illyria, southern Spain, and Italy into the empire. The Justinian dynasty ended in 602 with the deposition of Maurice and the accession of his successor, Phocas.

== Justin I ==
=== Early life and accession to the throne ===
The Justinian dynasty began with the accession of its namesake Justin I to the throne. Justin I was born in a village, Bederiana, in the 450s AD. Like many country youths, he went to Constantinople and enlisted in the army, where, due to his physical abilities, he became a part of the Excubitors, the palace guards. He fought in the Isaurian and Persian wars and rose through the ranks to become the commander of the Excubitors, which was a very influential position. In this time, he also achieved the rank of senator. After the death of the Emperor Anastasius, who had left no clear heir, there was much dispute as to who would become emperor. To decide who would ascend the throne, a grand meeting was called in the hippodrome. The senate, meanwhile, gathered in the great hall of the palace. Several candidates were nominated but were rejected by different factions for various reasons. After much arguing, Justin emerged as the consensus candidate; and he was crowned by the Patriarch of Constantinople, John of Cappadocia, on 10 July 518.

=== Reign ===
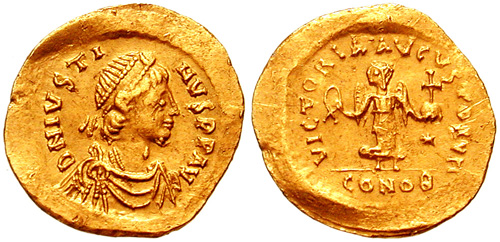
A coin showing the bust of Justin I.

Justin, who was from a Latin-speaking province, spoke little Greek and was mostly illiterate. As such, he surrounded himself with more educated advisers, the most notable of whom was his nephew, Justinian. Justinian may have exerted great influence on his uncle and is considered by some historians, such as Procopius, to be the real power behind the throne. After his accession, Justin removed the other candidates to the throne; two were executed, and three were punished either with death or exile. Unlike most emperors before him, who were Monophysite, Justin was a devout Chalcedonian Christian. Monophysites and the Chalcedonians were in conflict over the dual natures of Christ. Past emperors had supported the Monophysites' position, which was in direct conflict with the Chalcedonian teachings of the papacy, and this strife led to the Acacian schism. Justin, as a Chalcedonian, and John of Cappadocia, immediately set about repairing relations with Rome. After delicate negotiations, the Acacian schism ended in late March, 519.

After this initial ecclesiastical conflict, the rest of Justin's reign was relatively quiet and peaceful. In 525, perhaps at the insistence of Justinian, Justin repealed a law which effectively forbade court officials from marrying people of low class. This allowed Justinian to marry Theodora, who was of low social standing. In his last years, conflict increased around the Empire. There was increased strife with the Ostrogothic Kingdom in the Italian Peninsula. Their king, Theodoric the Great, was suspicious of plots by the Byzantines; and turned on the Roman senatorial class, going so far as executing the philosopher Boethius, who was attempting to end the persecution. However, Theodoric died in 526, ending the persecution. The Sasanian Empire, likewise, resumed hostilities with the Byzantines, and the Iberian War began in the east; which would not reach its conclusion until the reign of Justinian. In 527, Justin appointed Justinian co-emperor after becoming dangerously ill. Justin recovered from the illness, however, several months later, he died of an ulcer on an old wound; and Justinian then ascended the throne.

== Justinian I ==
After the Nika riots, Justinian initiated a new building program and reformed the law with the "Code of Justinian". Under Justinian's building program, many buildings were constructed, including the Hagia Sophia, Basilica Cistern, Dara Dam, and others.

Justinian had inherited a war with Persia from Justin I. Justinian continued the war, succeeding in sending a force all the way down the Euphrates, but the raid stalled, and he lost the beginnings of a new fortress in a defeat. This impasse of sorts led to Justinian negotiating the "Perpetual Peace" in 532 in which he agreed to pay 11,000 pounds of gold in return for a cease in hostilities and the defense of several mountain passes.

On his command, his favoured general Belisarius began reconquering former Roman territory, starting with the Vandals. The Vandals had maintained North African dominance since the fall of the Western Roman Empire. Their army battled the 15,000 men commanded by Belisarius. The Vandal king, Gelimer, attempted to surround the Byzantines at the Battle of Ad Decimum; he defeated Belisarius but was said to have become depressed after finding the body of his dead brother. Belisarius rounded up his remaining men and broke up the Vandal army. Belisarius went on to capture Carthage, and the Byzantines were victorious.

Justinian then recalled the victorious Belisarius. In Italy, dynastic squabbles amongst the Ostrogothic rulers, Amalasuintha and Theodahad, gave Justinian an opportunity to invade, and in 535 he sent Belisarius to Sicily with 7,500 men. Belisarius arrived and received only token resistance. He then moved on to mainland Italy. After putting down a mutiny in recently conquered North Africa, Belisarius landed in mainland Italy, finding the same token resistance. The Gothic garrison of Naples resisted however, and after several months siege Belisarius sacked the city. After king Theodahad was murdered by Vitiges, Belisarius was invited to Rome by Pope Silverius while the king was in Ravenna. Hearing of this, the Gothic king Vitiges sent a force to besiege Rome. Belisarius had been fortifying Rome, and a siege ensued.

The Goth army then moved to besiege Ariminium, which suffered from lack of food. Narses, another Byzantine general, was called in to help and he used his influence to help Belisarius break the siege. After a massacre at Milan, breaks in Narses' command chain were revealed; following a letter from Belisarius, Narses was recalled by Justinian. Thereafter, the campaign became a war of sieges, which came to an end after Belisarius pretended to accept an offer to become Western Roman Emperor. He marched into Ravenna unopposed, occupied it, then disposed of King Witigis.

Belisarius was recalled from Italy and then immediately sent to the Persian front, which had flared into warfare again. During this period, the Ostrogoths retook most of Italy. After the Persian front died down, with the Persians swearing they would never fight the Byzantines again until after his death, Belisarius retook Italy and captured southern Spain in a war that lasted 18 years.

Justinian's wars of reconquest had expanded the empire to include the former Roman provinces of Italia, Baetica, and Africa Proconsularis. These additions expanded the Byzantine Empire to the largest point in its history.

== Justin II ==
Upon Justinian's death in 565, he was succeeded by his nephew Justin, who following on from his predecessor's extensive reconquests and building programs, had inherited an empire which was territorially and financially strained. Justin II suspended payments to the Avars, causing them to instead seek wealth by raiding neighbouring tribes, upsetting the local balance of power. In-turn, Lombard hordes under king Alboin migrated west and invaded Italy, conquering much of the peninsula outside of the Rome-Ravenna corridor. In the East, war with the Persians did not go well in Syria, resulting in Justin's mental deterioration.

The Empire, near the end of the reign of Maurice

During a period of mental clarity, Justin appointed Tiberius as his successor in 574, and would later proclaim him Augustus prior to his own death in 578.

== Tiberius II ==
Tiberius II succeeded Justin II. His four-year reign was marked by imperial weakness because the empire was over-stretched. He reinforced Ravenna, and his generals found success against the Persians in battles in Armenia and against the Berbers in North Africa. At the same time, the Slavs began migrating all the way down into Greece. The emperor could not pay the army of the East which was fighting the Persians, and they threatened to mutiny. As his forces were deployed elsewhere, the Avars took advantage of him and forced Tiberius to give up the key city of Sirmium. After this setback, Tiberius ate some bad food, which may have been intentionally poisoned, fell ill, and died. Tiberius II has drawn criticism from many due to his exorbitant spending, as he had given away 7200 pounds of gold each year for four years, alongside other substantial treasures, which he donated to the poor.

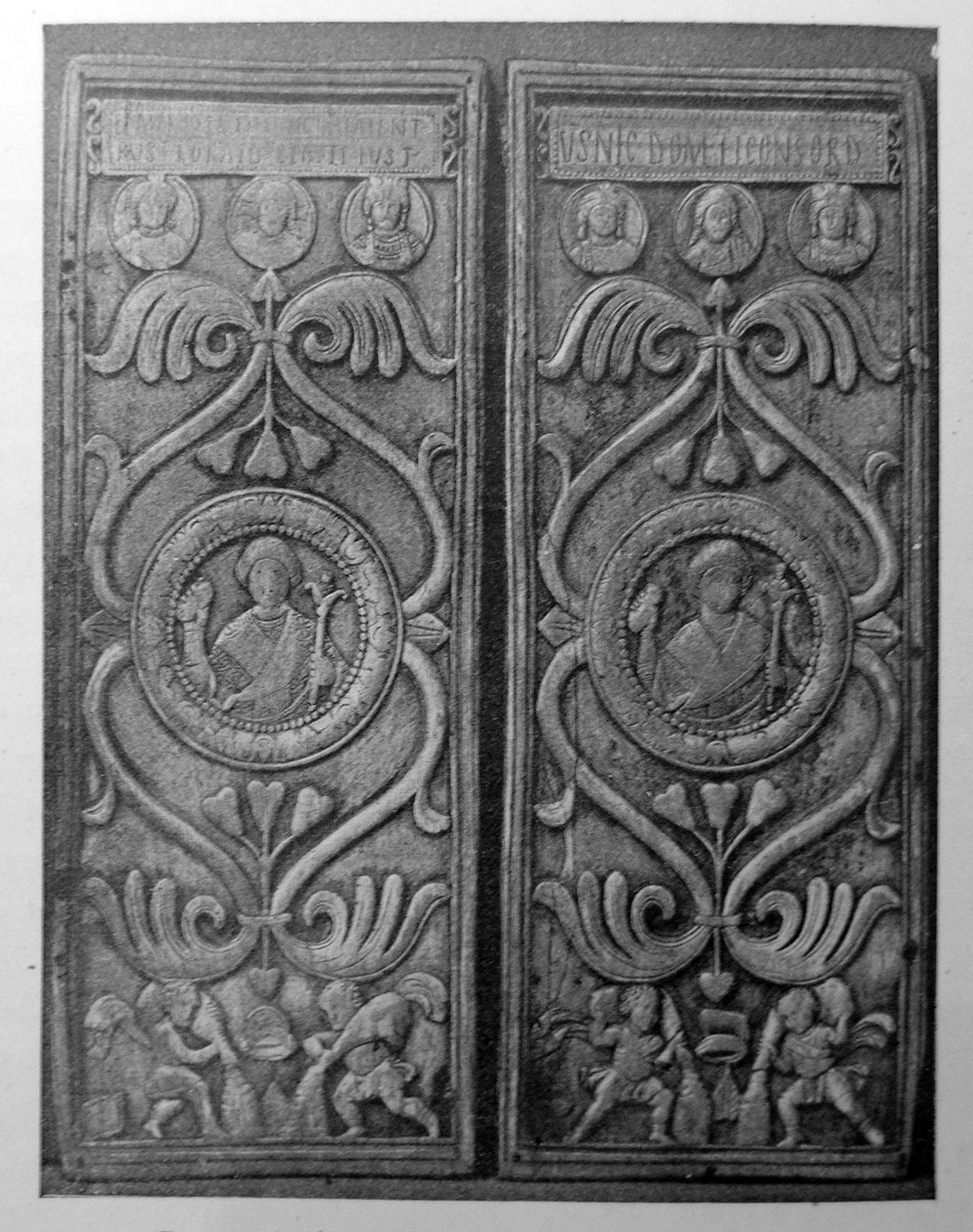
Consular diptych (540) of Justin, son of Germanus, cousin of Justinian

== Maurice ==
Maurice, the fifth and final emperor of the Justinian dynasty, reportedly came from Armenia and began his career in Constantinople as a notarius. He eventually rose to the rank of secretary of the imperial bodyguard and in 577 was appointed commander in chief of the army. After hard campaigning in the East in the Byzantine–Sassanid War of 572–591, he was promoted to the rank of patricius. In 582 he married Tiberius' daughter and succeeded him on the throne at the age of 43.

Maurice's reign was marked by constant financial strains. He also inherited military troubles: the Slavs were continuing to migrate into the empire, oftentimes violently; imperial hold over Italy was greatly reduced; he also still had to continue the war with Persia that he had fought in for his entire military career. This Persian war also struggled with money difficulties, leading to a major mutiny in 588; however, the money dispute was resolved the following spring. During the mutiny, a civil war began between rival factions in Persia, and Maurice saw an opportunity. He gave his support to Khosrow II in Persia, and he succeeded in gaining the throne. This ended the Byzantine-Sassanid War of 572–591. Following the war, Byzantine influence and control in the Caucasus was expanded, and the empire ceased to pay Persia any tribute.

Maurice then turned his attention to the Balkans, which, after a decade of inattention from the army, had become ravaged by the Slavs. With the full attention of the army, the Byzantines drove back the Slavs, expelled them from the empire, and then ravaged their lands beyond the Danube. The Byzantines, after this decisive victory, were now easily able to hold the frontier on the Danube as it had been since the classical Roman times, as well as gain control over some minor territories in southern Dacia.

Despite these extensive military victories, Maurice was disliked because he often had to reduce payments to his soldiers. As a result of this unpopularity, he was deposed by the army in 602 and replaced with their choice, Phocas.

== Genealogy ==
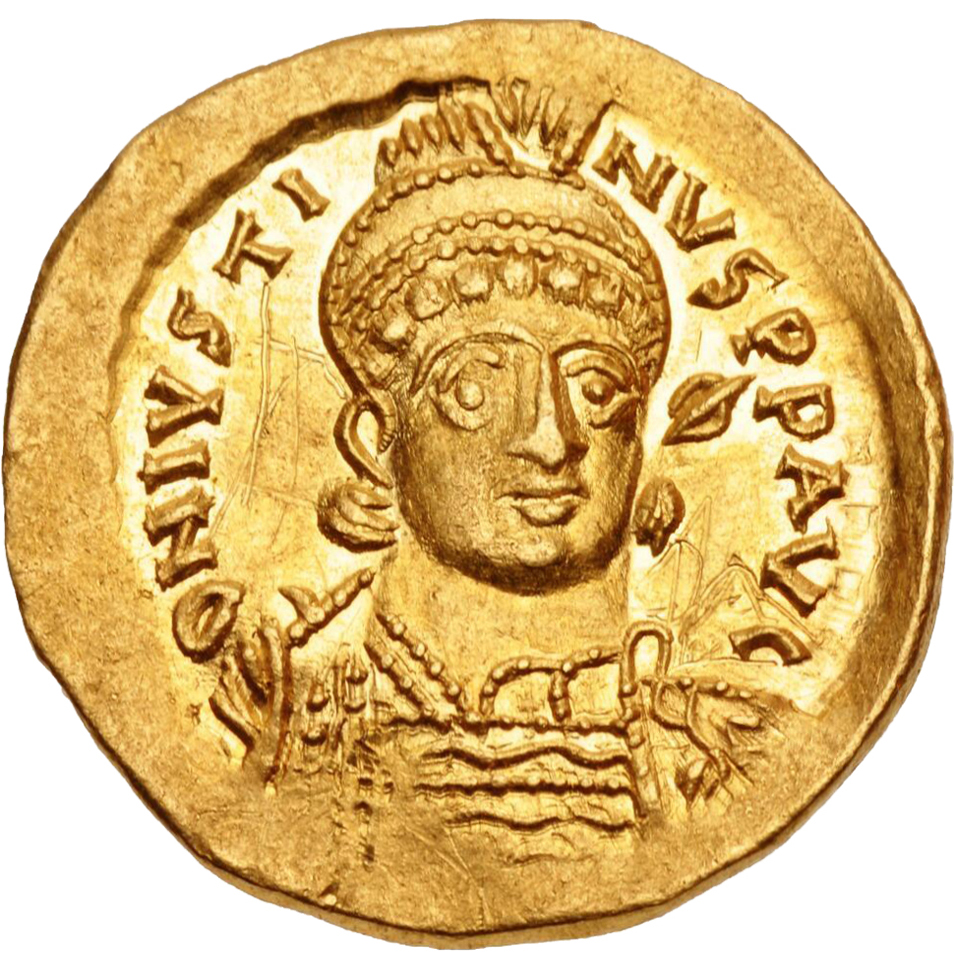
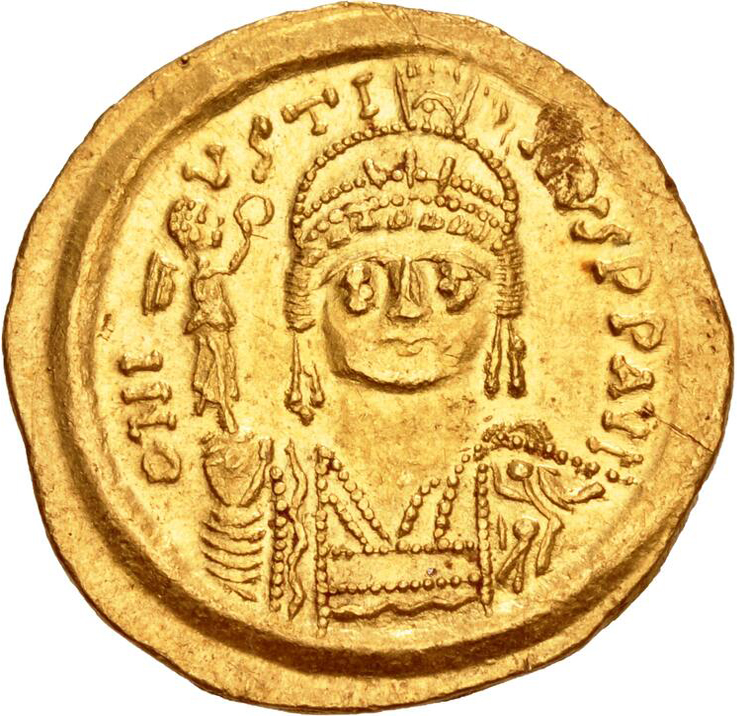
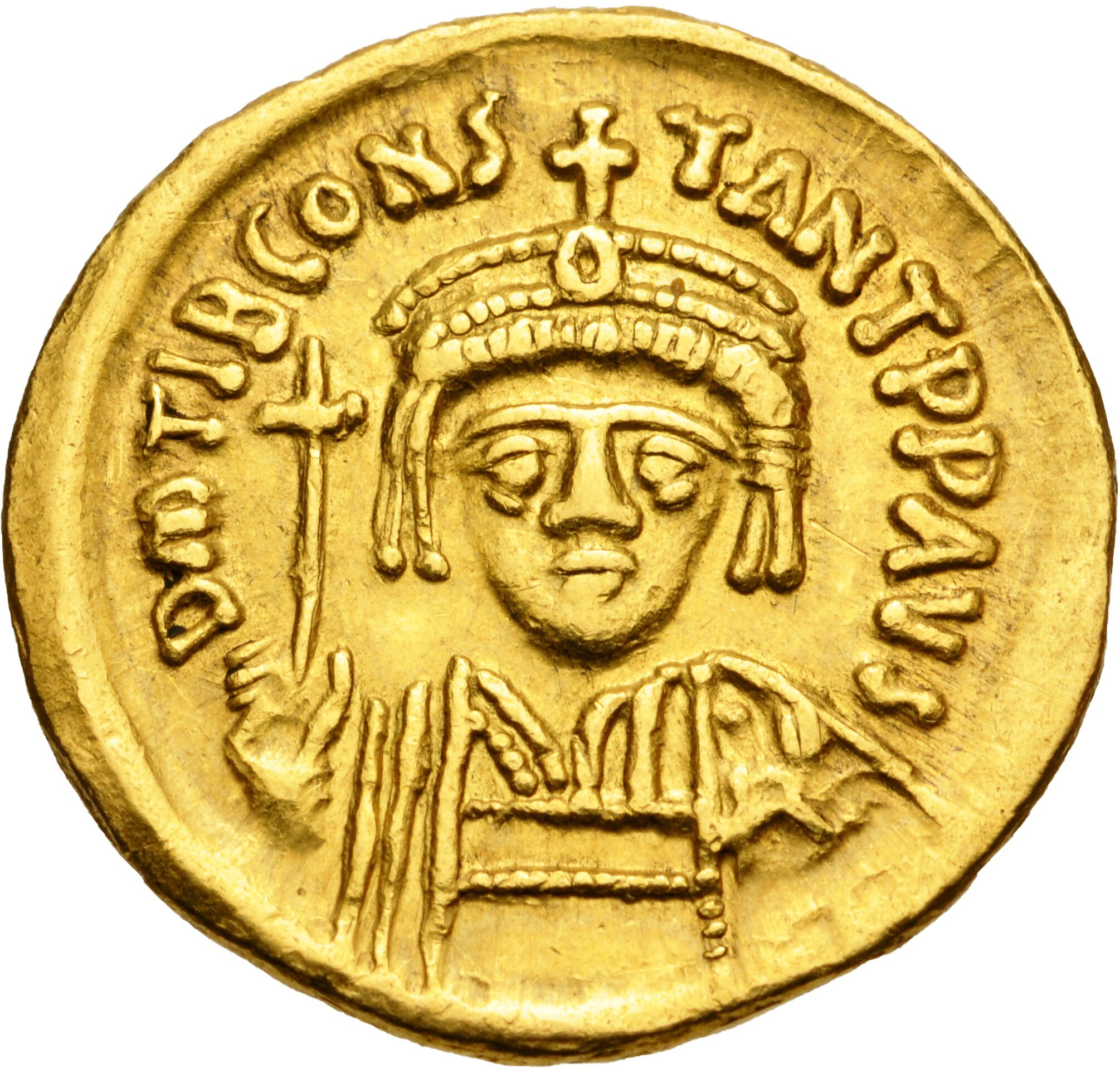
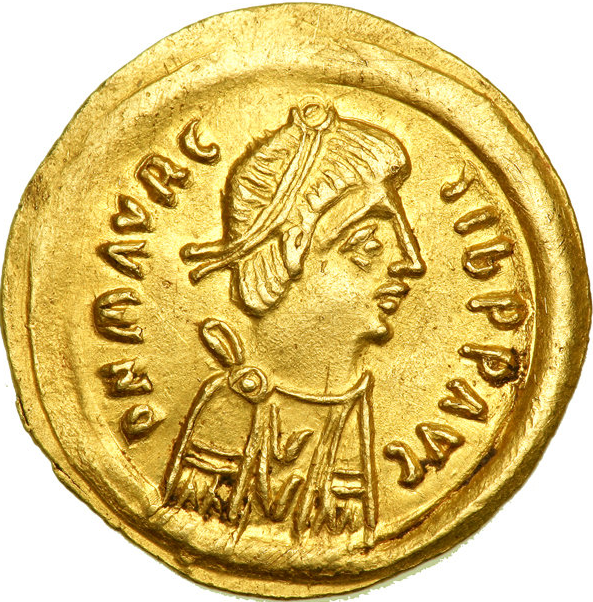
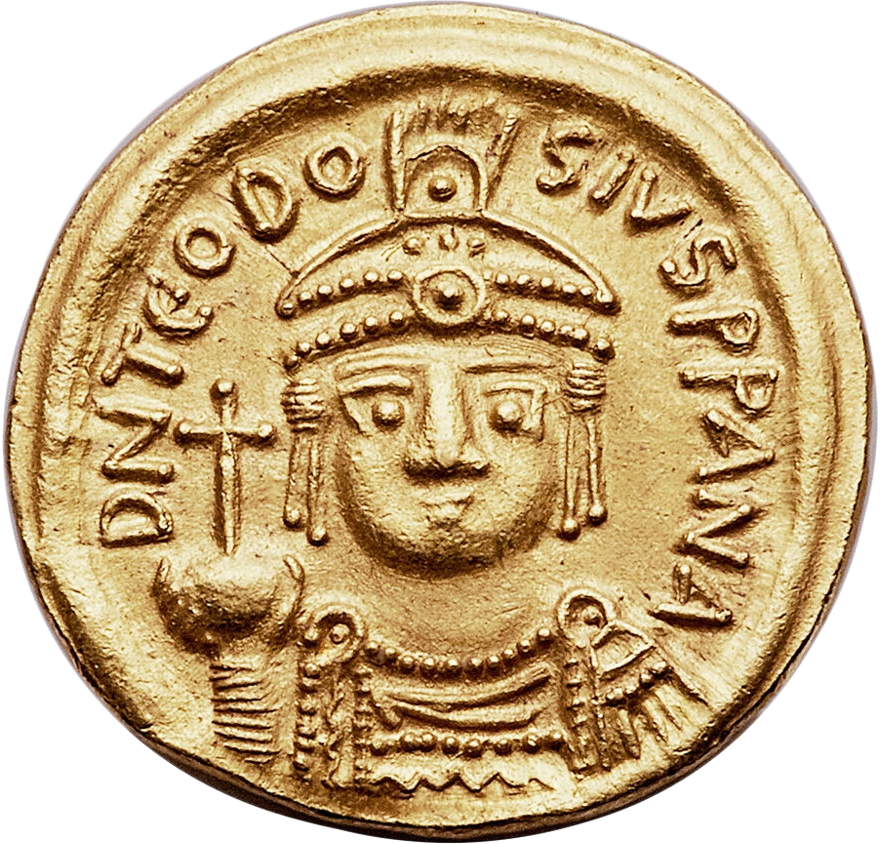
Leo I emperor 457-474; LEONIDS
Ariadne	Anastasius I emperor 491-518	(sibling)	Euphemia	Justin I 518–527	Vigilantia	Petrus Sabbatius	(sibling)
(daughter)	Comito	Theodora	Justinian I 527–565	Vigilantia ∞ Dulcidius	Germanus	Boraides
Anastasius consul 517	Sophia ∞ Justin II	(illeg.); Theodora	Justin II; 565–578	Marcellus general ∞ Juliana	Praejecta ∞ 1.Areobindus magister 2. John	Justin consul 540	Justinian general
Arabia ∞ Baduarius
Areobindus	Tiberius II; 578–582	Ino Anastasia
Anastasia Areobinda	Peter curopalates	Maurice; 582–602	Constantina
Tiberius	Theodosius co-emperor 590–602

== Timeline ==
- Red denotes Senior Emperor
- Pink denotes Junior Emperors
- Orange denotes Caesars
- Yellow denotes Nobelissimoi

== See also ==
- Family tree of Byzantine emperors
- History of the Byzantine Empire
- Barbarian kingdoms

== Sources ==
- Bury, John Bagnall (1923). History of the Later Roman Empire. Macmillan & Co. Ltd – via LacusCurtius.
- Cameron, Averil (2000). "Chapter 3". The Cambridge Ancient History. Cambridge University Press. ISBN 978-0-521-32591-2.
- Cameron, Averil; Ward-Perkins, Bryan & Whitby, Michael (2000). The Cambridge Ancient History. Vol. 14. Late Antiquity: Empire and Successors, A.D. 425 - 600. Cambridge University Press.
- Corrick, James (2006). The Byzantine Empire. Farmington Mills MI: Thompson & Gale.
- Sarris, Peter (27 October 2011). Empires of Faith: The Fall of Rome to the Rise of Islam, 500-700. OUP Oxford. ISBN 978-0-19-162002-7.
- Treadgold, Warren T. (1997). A History of the Byzantine State and Society. Stanford University Press. ISBN 978-0-8047-2630-6.
