= Constantina (empress) =

Empress consort of Maurice of the Byzantine Empire

- Augusta
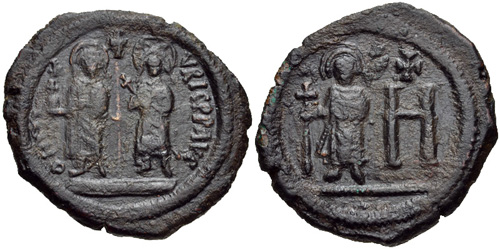
- Rare copper follis from Cherson depicting Maurice, Constantina and their eldest son, Theodosius

Empress consort of the Eastern Roman Empire
- Tenure: 582–602
- Born: c. 560
- Died: c. 605; Constantinople (now Istanbul, Turkey)
- Burial: Monastery of St. Mamas
- Spouse: Maurice
- Issue more...: Theodosius; Tiberius
- Dynasty: Justinian Dynasty
- Father: Tiberius II Constantine
- Mother: Ino Anastasia

Constantina (Greek: Κωνσταντίνα; c. 560 – c. 605) was the empress consort of Maurice of the Eastern Roman Empire. She was a daughter of Tiberius II Constantine and Ino Anastasia.

== Birth ==
Her original name was Augusta. She had an older sister named Charito, and another sibling, who is unknown and is presumed to have died. Her father Tiberius was Comes Excubitorum (Commander of the Excubitors) under Justin II and succeeded him as emperor. Her parentage was recorded in the histories of John of Ephesus and Evagrius Scholasticus and the chronicles of Theophylact Simocatta, Paul the Deacon, and John of Biclaro.

The Georgian Chronicle identifies Constantina as a daughter of Khosrau II. However the Chronicle was compiled in the 13th century and so the contradictory parentage is considered a mistake. Other later accounts make Constantina his mother-in-law through her – most likely fictional – daughter Miriam/Maria.

== Caesar's daughter ==
Justin reportedly suffered from temporary fits of insanity and was unable to perform his duties as early as the fall of Dara to Khosrau I of the Sassanid Empire in November 573. East Roman historians such as Evagrius Scholasticus and Menander Protector mention Tiberius as gaining power alongside the empress Sophia, wife of Justin. As a regent, Sophia recommended Tiberius in the position of caesar.

According to the chronicle of Theophanes the Confessor, Tiberius was officially appointed caesar by Justin on 7 December 574. He was also adopted by Justin and thus became his appointed heir. At this point Ino emerged as caesarissa, the second-ranking lady in the empire, and Constantina and her sister Charito became members of the imperial family.

The ecclesiastic history of John of Ephesus and the chronicle of Theophanes both consider Sophia planning to marry Tiberius herself, his current marriage seen as an offense to her. Ino and her daughters were not allowed to enter the Great Palace of Constantinople and were instead settled in the palace of Hormisdas, residence of Justinian I prior to his elevation to the throne. According to John of Ephesus, Tiberius joined them every evening and returned to the Great Palace every morning. Sophia also refused to let the ladies at court visit Ino and her daughters, which would have been seen as a token of respect to them.

Ino eventually left Constantinople in favor of Daphnudium, her previous residence. According to John of Ephesus, Tiberius left Constantinople to visit Ino when she fell sick. Her daughters are assumed to have joined her in her departure from the capital.

== Daughter of emperor ==
In September 578 Justin II appointed Tiberius as his co-emperor. On 5 October 578 Justin was dead and Tiberius became the sole emperor. According to John of Ephesus, Sophia sent Patriarch Eutychius of Constantinople to Tiberius to convince him to divorce Ino, offering both herself and her adult daughter Arabia as prospective brides for the new emperor. Tiberius refused.

Tiberius apparently feared for the safety of his wife and daughters. John of Ephesus reports the three women were secretly smuggled into Constantinople by boat, late at night. Ino was proclaimed empress in a public ceremony and received the rank of augusta. Sophia also retained her rank and continued to hold a section of the palace to herself.

The reign of her father as emperor was relatively short. In 582, Tiberius fell ill and the matter of succession became urgent. As before, Sophia was asked to choose a successor for a dying emperor and chose Maurice, a general who had accomplished a number of victories over Hormizd IV, son and successor of Khosrau I. According to Gregory of Tours, she was planning to marry the new imperial heir.

== Marriage ==
Gregory of Tours presents the marriages of Constantina and Charito as Tiberius outmaneuvering Sophia in securing the loyalties of his sons-in-law. On August 5, 582, Constantina was betrothed to Maurice and Charito to Germanus. (Note: Germanus was a patrician and governor of Africa Province. He is tentatively identified with a similarly named posthumous son of Germanus (cousin of Justinian I) and Matasuntha (Note: Matasuntha was a daughter of Amalasuntha and Eutharic. Eutharic is given by Jordanes as a son of Vetericus, grandson of Berimud, and great-grandson of Thorismund.) mentioned by Jordanes or an unnamed son of Justinian, the second son of Germanus.) Both men were named Caesars and became likely successors. It was at this point that she received her name Constantina, in addition to her birth name Augusta, and Maurice was bestowed with the name Tiberius.

A historical interpretation for the dual marriage was that Tiberius intended to appoint two co-emperors as his successors, possibly with a division of provinces between them. Whether there were such plans, they never took form. According to John of Nikiû, Germanus was Tiberius' favored candidate for the throne but declined out of humility.

On 13 August Tiberius was already on his deathbed and civilian, military, and ecclesiastical dignitaries awaited the appointment of his successor. Tiberius had reportedly prepared a speech on the matter but was too weak to speak. The quaestor sacri palatii read it for him. The speech proclaimed Maurice an augustus and sole successor to the throne. On 14 August Tiberius died and Maurice became emperor. Constantina remained his betrothed.

== Empress ==
The marriage of Constantina and Maurice took place in autumn 582. The ceremony was performed by Patriarch John IV and is described in detail by Theophylact Simocatta. The bridal attendant was the eunuch Margarites. Constantina was proclaimed an augusta while both Sophia and Anastasia also kept the same title. John of Ephesus mentions all three augustas residing in the Great Palace.

Anastasia was the first of the three ladies to die. Theophanes places her death in 593. Constantina seems to have enjoyed better relations with Sophia than her mother did. Theophanes records them to have jointly offered a precious crown as an Easter present to Maurice in 601. He accepted their gift but then ordered it hang over the altar of the Hagia Sophia as his own tribute to the church, which according to Theophanes was taken an insult by both augustas and caused a rift in the marriage.

== Deposition and death ==
On 22 November 602, during the mutiny of the Danubian army and the citywide riots fanned by the circus factions, Maurice, Constantina, and their children left Constantinople in a warship. Phocas, the leader of the mutinous troops, was proclaimed an emperor on 23 November.

The warship faced a winter storm at sea and sought refuge at the Asian coast of the Sea of Marmara, not far from Nicomedia. Maurice suffered from arthritis and was incapacitated by severe pain after his flight at sea. Troops loyal to Phocas captured the deposed imperial family days later and brought them to Chalcedon. On 27 November, all five sons were executed before the eyes of their father. Then Maurice himself was executed. Constantina survived as a widow.

In 603, Constantina and her three daughters were exiled to a monastery, known as "House of Leo". The monastery has been tentatively identified with the Monastery of St. Mamas, founded and run by their relative Gordia, a sister of Maurice.

Theophanes records that Constantina maintained contact with Germanus, and that both were conspiring against Phocas after hearing rumors of Theodosius' survival. Their messages were entrusted to Petronia, a maidservant under Constantina. Petronia proved disloyal and reported the conspiracy to Phocas. Constantina was arrested and placed in the custody of Theopemptus, prefect of Constantinople. Her interrogation included torture and she was forced to give the name of her fellow conspirators.

Constantina and all three of her daughters were executed at Chalcedon. Germanus and a daughter of his were also executed. The daughter, whose name has been lost, had been the widow of Theodosius. Theophanes places the deaths in 605/606 but the exact date is in doubt.

The Patria of Constantinople, attributed to George Codinus, mentions Constantina was decapitated and her corpse thrown into the Bosporus; however, De Ceremoniis by Constantine VII mentions Maurice, Constantina, and their children buried at the monastery of St. Mamas.

== Family and children ==
The marriage was fertile and produced nine known children:

- Theodosius (4 August 583/585 – after 27 November 602). According to John of Ephesus, he was the first son born to a reigning emperor since the birth of Theodosius II in 401. He was appointed Caesar in 587 and co-emperor on 26 March 590.
- Tiberius (d. 27 November 602).
- Petrus (d. 27 November 602).
- Paulus (d. 27 November 602).
- Justin (d. 27 November 602).
- Justinian (d. 27 November 602).
- Anastasia (d. c. 605).
- Theoctista (d. c. 605).
- Cleopatra (d. c. 605).

A daughter Miriam/Maria is recorded by the 12th-century chronicler Michael the Syrian as married to Khosrau II, but her existence is most likely fictional as she is not mentioned by any Byzantine source. If real, she would have been born soon after Constantina's marriage to Maurice in 582.

== Sources ==
- Charles, Robert H. (2007) [1916]. The Chronicle of John, Bishop of Nikiu: Translated from Zotenberg's Ethiopic Text. Merchantville, NJ: Evolution Publishing. ISBN 9781889758879.
- Whitby, Michael. (1988), The Emperor Maurice and his historian: Theophylact Simocatta on Persian and Balkan warfare, Oxford University Press, ISBN 0-19-822945-3
- Continuité des élites à Byzance durante les siècles obscurs. Les princes caucasiens et l'Empire du VIe au IXe siècle, 2006

Royal titles
Preceded by Ino Anastasia	Byzantine Empress consort 582–602	Succeeded by Leontia
