= Germanus (patricius) =

Byzantine senator (died c. 605)

Germanus, called "patricius" (Greek: πατρίκιος; died c. 605), was a leading member of the Byzantine senate during the reign of Maurice.

== Identification and family ==
Theophylact Simocatta (fl. c. 630) describes him as "an exceedingly distinguished man, who was a most illustrious member of the senate." However, there is no named relative of Germanus. His name has led to a possible identification with an identically named posthumous son (b. 550/551) of Germanus (cousin of Justinian I) (d. 550) and Matasuntha, or an unnamed son of the general Justinian, the second son of the senior Germanus. Many historians equate the patricius Germanus with the caesar Germanus (fl. 582), a son-in-law of Tiberius II Constantine and Ino Anastasia that refused to be emperor. Historian Michael Whitby considers all three patricius, caesar and postumus to be the same person. On the other hand, PLRE treats Germanus patricius and postumus as distinct from the caesar.

== Under Maurice ==
In November 601 or more likely, in February 602, an unnamed daughter of Germanus married Theodosius, the eldest son of Maurice and Constantina. The marriage was recorded by Theophylact Simocatta, the Chronicon Paschale, Theophanes the Confessor, Joannes Zonaras and Georgios Kedrenos.

On 2 February 602, Theophylact records Germanus rescuing the life of Theodosius from a rioting mob in Constantinople, angry over a food shortage. Later that year, Germanus and Theodosius went hunting to Callicrateia, a brief distance from Constantinople. There they received correspondence from the rebellious army of Thrace. The rebels demanded the deposition of Maurice and offered their support to elevate either Theodosius or Germanus to the throne.

Germanus was soon accused of treason by Maurice. The emperor suspected him of being responsible for the ongoing revolt. Besides the incriminating letter, there was another act pointing to the rebels being allied to Germanus. They were reportedly seizing all horses outside Constantinople, but had left Germanus' horses alone. Germanus pleaded for his innocence in vain. Theodosius whispered to his father-in-law an instruction to flee before facing the wrath of Maurice.

On 21 November, Germanus and his bodyguard sought sanctuary, first in the church to the Theotokos created by Cyrus of Panopolis, then in the Hagia Sophia. Maurice had attempted to persuade him away from the sanctuary via the eunuch Stephen but it failed as Germanus repelled Stephen. So Maurice sent his own guards to capture Germanus and turmoil followed. Germanus considered surrendering but a crowd sympathetic to him convinced him otherwise. They were convinced that Maurice was intending to execute Germanus. The crowd soon included the members of the circus factions, and riots intensified, during which the house of the praetorian prefect Constantine Lardys burned down.

== Under Phocas ==
That night, on 22 November 602, Maurice fled Constantinople to escape the advancing rebels. Germanus took his chance to claim the throne. He tried to enlist the support of the Greens by conveying an agreement to their leader. But he had miscalculated as the Greens firmly rejected him for his well-known support for the Blues. Germanus immediately turned to support Phocas, the leader of the rebels. According to Theophylact, Phocas had briefly considered elevating Germanus to the throne, but instead seized the throne for himself. Phocas was crowned on 23 November and entered Constantinople two days later. He captured and executed Maurice and his sons.

A rumor of the time suggested that Germanus had managed to save the life of Theodosius by bribing Phocas' men. Theophylact dismisses any truth to the rumor. In any case, Phocas did not trust Germanus. The Chronicon (fl. c. 630–640) mentions Germanus being made a priest in 603. Theophanes (fl. c. 815) considers this to be a direct decision by Phocas, who had discovered Germanus conspiring against him. For this plot, he writes that in 605, Germanus organized Constantina's escape to Hagia Sophia and tried to win over the Greens, but the faction members rejected them. However, some modern historians believe that Theophanes confused his story and was instead re-narrating their initial incarceration in 603 and Germanus' failed attempt for the throne.

If Phocas believed that he was finished with Germanus, he was wrong. Theophanes records that Constantina maintained contact with Germanus and that both were conspiring against Phocas after hearing the reports of Theodosius' survival. Their messages were entrusted to Petronia, a maidservant under Constantina. Petronia proved disloyal and reported the conspiracy to Phocas. Constantina was arrested and placed in the custody of Theopemptus, prefect of Constantinople. Her interrogation included torture and she was forced to give the name of her fellow conspirators.

Constantina and all three of her daughters were executed at Chalcedon. Germanus and his unnamed daughter were also executed on the island of Prote. The daughter had been the widow of Theodosius. Theophanes places the deaths in 605/606 but the exact date is in doubt.

== Sources ==
- Howard-Johnston, James (2021). The Last Great War of Antiquity. Oxford University Press.
- Martindale, John R., ed. (1992). The Prosopography of the Later Roman Empire: Volume III, AD 527–641. Cambridge: Cambridge University Press. ISBN 0-521-20160-8.
- Whitby, Michael. (1988), The Emperor Maurice and his historian: Theophylact Simocatta on Persian and Balkan warfare, Oxford University Press, ISBN 0-19-822945-3
- The History of Theophylact Simocatta: An English Translation With Introduction and Notes. Translated by Michael, Whitby; Whitby, Mary. Oxford University Press. 1986. ISBN 0-19-822799-X.
- The Chronicle of Theophanes the Confessor. Translated by Mango, Cyril; Scott, Roger. Clarendon Press. 1997. ISBN 978-0198225683.
- Stephenson, Paul (2022). New Rome: The Empire in the East. Harvard University Press. ISBN 9780674659629.
