= Historia Ecclesiastica =

Historia Ecclesiastica (Latin, meaning "Church History") is the name of many different works, documenting the history of Christianity, including:

- Alexander Natalis
- Bartholomew of Lucca, Historia Ecclesiastica Nova
- Bede, Historia ecclesiastica gentis Anglorum
- Eusebius of Caesarea, Historia Ecclesiastica (4th century)
- Evagrius Scholasticus
  - Tyrannius Rufinus, translating Eusebius
- Orderic Vitalis#The Historia Ecclesiastica
- Socrates Scholasticus
- Sozomen
- Theodoret

== See also ==
- Ecclesiastical History (disambiguation)
- Church History (disambiguation)
