= Eustathius of Epiphania =

Byzantine historian

Eustathius of Epiphania (Ancient Greek: Εὐστάθιος Ἐπιφανεύς, died after 518) was a sixth-century Byzantine historian.

Eustathius was born in Epiphania (modern Hama, Syria). He was probably a Christian and wrote in the time of the emperor Anastasius I a history (Chronological Epitome) from the fall of Troy to the 12th year of Anastasius (502/3) in two parts. The chronicle was used by later historians, but only a few fragments remain preserved in Evagrius Scholasticus, the Suda and John Malalas. According to Evagrius, Eustathius's work was an epitome (a compilation, not an abridgement) of pagan and ecclesiastical writers.

Eustathius is also known to have compiled an epitome of Josephus (Historikon of the Judaean Archaeology by Iosepos). It is likely the same as a short 13th/14th-century text preserved in Paris. It begins with Adam and Eve and reaches to the reign of Vespasian and Titus.
