= Germanus (Caesar) =

Caesar of the Byzantine Empire

Germanus was a Caesar of the Eastern Roman Empire. He married Charito, a daughter of Tiberius II Constantine and Ino Anastasia.

According to Michael Whitby, Germanus was a patrician and governor of the praetorian prefecture of Africa. He was chosen by the dying Tiberius II as a viable heir for his throne in 582. "In a dual ceremony on 5 August Germanus ... and Maurice were elevated to the rank of Caesar and betrothed to Tiberius' two daughters, Charito and Constantina."

Whitby regards the arrangement as indicating Tiberius' plans to have two co-rulers as successors. He suggests that the dying emperor might have even been trying to reintroduce the concept of a Western and Eastern Roman Emperor, with Germanus and Maurice chosen for their respective connections to the western and eastern provinces. Germanus apparently rejected this proposition; John of Nikiû records that: "Before [Tiberius] died he gave orders that his son-in-law, named Germanus, should be raised to the imperial throne. Now he had formerly been patrician. But owing to his humility of heart he refused to be emperor. Thereupon Maurice, who was of the province of Cappadocia, was made emperor". This narrative is somewhat contradicted by the Historia Francorum of Gregory of Tours, which also records Byzantine events. He depicts Maurice as hand-picked to be heir, first by dowager empress Sophia and then by Tiberius II, but this account is doubted by Whitby. Germanus is not recorded afterwards, and on 11 August 582, only Maurice is recorded as Caesar in the subscription of a law of Tiberius.

His parentage is uncertain. Whitby identifies Germanus with a similarly named son (b. 550/551) born to Germanus (d. 550) and Matasuntha. Matasuntha was a daughter of Eutharic and Amalasuintha, and a sister of Athalaric, king of the Ostrogoths. Another possible father of Germanus is general Justinian, who was a son of the senior Germanus.

According to a statement in Jordanes' Getica, the senior Germanus was a descendant of the noble Roman clan of the Anicii. The exact nature of his connection, however, if it is anything more than a literary device to indicate noble descent, is unclear. Theodor Mommsen hypothesized that his mother could have been a daughter of Anicia Juliana.

Germanus disappears from sources following his marriage. A number of historians identify him with the patricius Germanus mentioned in the 7th century, whose daughter married Maurice's eldest son Theodosius, though the identification is not conclusive.

== Sources ==
- Bury, John Bagnell (1958) [1923], History of the Later Roman Empire: From the Death of Theodosius I to the Death of Justinian, Volume 2, Mineola, New York: Dover Publications, OCLC 41478187
- Charles, Robert H. (2007) [1916]. The Chronicle of John, Bishop of Nikiu: Translated from Zotenberg's Ethiopic Text. Merchantville, NJ: Evolution Publishing. ISBN 9781889758879.
- Martindale, John R., ed. (1992). The Prosopography of the Later Roman Empire: Volume III, AD 527–641. Cambridge: Cambridge University Press. ISBN 0-521-20160-8.
- Whitby, Michael (1988), The Emperor Maurice and his historian: Theophylact Simocatta on Persian and Balkan warfare, Oxford University Press, ISBN 0-19-822945-3
