= Ecclesiastical History =

Ecclesiastical History may refer to:

- Church History (Eusebius)
- Ecclesiastical History (Zacharias Rhetor)
- Ecclesiastical History of the English People by Bede
- Ecclesiastical History, by Evagrius Scholasticus

== See also ==
- Historia Ecclesiastica (disambiguation)
- Church History (disambiguation)
- History of Christianity
