= Church History =

Church History may refer to

- The history of the Christian Church
  - The academic discipline of Church history
  - The History of Christianity as a whole
- Church History (journal)
- Church History (Eusebius)
- Ecclesiastical history (Catholicism)

== See also ==
- Ecclesiastical History (disambiguation)
- Historia Ecclesiastica (disambiguation)
