= Ino Anastasia =

- Augusta
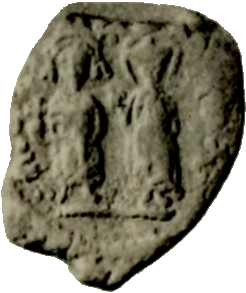
- Anastasia (right) on a coin minted under her husband Tiberius II Constantine (left)

Empress consort of the Eastern Roman Empire
- Tenure: 578–582
- Born: Ino; 6th century
- Died: 593; Constantinople (now Istanbul, Turkey)
- Burial: Church of the Holy Apostles
- Spouse: Ioannes; Tiberius II Constantine
- Issue: Unknown issue; Charito; Constantina
Names
- Aelia Anastasia
Regnal name
- Aelia Anastasia Augusta
- Dynasty: Justinian Dynasty

Ino (Greek: Ἰνώ), renamed Aelia Anastasia (died 593) was the Empress consort of Tiberius II Constantine (r. 578–582) of the Eastern Roman Empire, and Augusta from 578 until her death.

== Life ==
=== Early life and marriages ===
According to the account of John of Ephesus, Ino came from Daphnudium, possibly the island of Daphnousia off the coast of Bithynia in the Black Sea. She was first married to the optio Ioannes, a low-ranking executive officer of the Byzantine army. They had a daughter who was betrothed to Tiberius. Her husband and daughter both died prior to the conclusion of the marriage contract, and Ino herself married Tiberius instead.

John of Ephesus mentions that Ino and Tiberius had three children. Daughters Constantina and Charito are known by name. The third child is considered to have died prior to the elevation of Tiberius to the rank of Caesar.

=== Caesar's wife ===
Tiberius served as Comes Excubitorum (Commander of the Excubitors) under Justin II. Justin reportedly suffered from temporary fits of insanity and was unable to perform his duties as early as the fall of the important fortress of Dara to Khosrau I of the Sassanid Empire in November 573. East Roman historians such as Evagrius Scholasticus and Menander Protector mention Tiberius as gaining power alongside Sophia, wife of Justin. As a regent, Sophia recommended Tiberius in the position of caesar.

According to the chronicle of Theophanes the Confessor, Tiberius was officially appointed Caesar by Justin on 7 December 574. He was also adopted by Justin and thus became his appointed heir. At this point Ino emerged as Caesarissa, the second-ranking lady in the Empire.

The Ecclesiastic History of John of Ephesus and the chronicle of Theophanes the Confessor both record that Sophia considered planning to marry Tiberius herself. His current marriage was seen as an offense to her, and Ino and her daughters were not allowed to enter the Great Palace of Constantinople. They were instead settled in the palace of Hormisdas, residence of Justinian I prior to his elevation to the throne. According to John of Ephesus, Tiberius joined them every evening and returned to the Great Palace every morning. Sophia also refused to let the ladies at court visit Ino and her daughters as a token of respect to them.

Eventually however, to escape Sophia's displeasure, Ino and her daughters left Constantinople for her native Daphnudium. According to John of Ephesus, Tiberius left Constantinople to visit Ino when she fell sick.

=== Empress ===
In September 578, Justin II appointed Tiberius as his co-emperor, and on 5 October 578, Justin died and Tiberius became sole emperor. According to John of Ephesus, Sophia sent Patriarch Eutychius of Constantinople to Tiberius to convince him to divorce Ino, offering both herself and her adult daughter Arabia as prospective brides for the new Emperor. Tiberius refused.

Tiberius apparently feared for the safety of his wife and daughters. John of Ephesus reports that the three women were secretly smuggled into Constantinople by boat, late at night. Ino arrived safely and her husband arranged for her meetings with Eutychius and members of the Byzantine Senate. Ino was proclaimed Empress in a public ceremony and received the rank of Augusta.

Her name may have been considered inappropriate for a Christian Empress as it had Hellenic overtones. The original Ino was a daughter of Cadmus and Harmonia, identified with the goddess Leucothea. According to John of Ephesus, Ino received the name Anastasia (and officially Aelia Anastasia), suggested by the Blue chariot racing faction. Their rivals the Greens had suggested the name Helena.

Anastasia was not the only Augusta. Sophia also retained her rank and continued to hold a section of the palace to herself. Anastasia's religious affiliation is unknown. According to John of Ephesus, she was hostile to the Monophysites, but her actual belief is unknown.

=== Mother-in-law ===
On 14 August 582, Tiberius died. He was succeeded by Maurice, a general betrothed to Constantina. The marriage of Constantina and Maurice took place in autumn 582. Constantina was also proclaimed an Augusta while both Sophia and Anastasia kept the same title. John of Ephesus mentions all three Augustas residing in the Great Palace.

Theophanes records the death of Anastasia in the year 593. She was buried in the Church of the Holy Apostles, alongside her husband.

Royal titles
| Preceded by Sophia | Byzantine Empress consort 578–582 | Succeeded by Constantina |
