= Constantine Lardys =

Byzantine government official

Constantine, surnamed Lardys, (Greek: Κωνσταντίνος ὁ Λαρδῦς, romanized: Kōnstantinos ho Lardys) was one of the senior-most officials of the late reign of the Byzantine emperor Maurice (r. 582–602).

Constantine Lardys was one of the leading members of the Byzantine Senate and a patrikios. He held the powerful post of praetorian prefect of the East some time during the latter part of Maurice's reign, although by 602 he held the post of curator of the palace of Hormisdas (curator domus divinae) and the extensive imperial estates attached to it. Constantine's tenure as praetorian prefect was unpopular due to the stringent financial policies pursued by Maurice.

Constantine played an important role in the turmoil that ended Maurice's reign in 602, brought about by the mutiny of the Danubian army. The already tense domestic situation was exacerbated when Constantine incurred the hostility of the influential Green racing faction, which led to the Greens protesting in the Hippodrome of Constantinople and to subsequent riots against Maurice, during which Constantine's house was burned down.

On the day after the riots, 22 November, Maurice, with his family and closest associates fled the capital before the advancing rebel army under Phocas, and crossed over to Chalcedon. In a bid to secure the support of the Persian shah Khosrow II (r. 590–628), Maurice dispatched his eldest son and co-emperor, Theodosius, to the East, and sent Constantine Lardys to accompany him. They were soon recalled, however, and on their return fell into the hands of Phocas's men and were executed at Chalcedon, a few days after the execution of Maurice and his other sons.

== Sources ==
- Martindale, John R., ed. (1992). The Prosopography of the Later Roman Empire: Volume III, AD 527–641. Cambridge: Cambridge University Press. ISBN 0-521-20160-8.
- Whitby, Michael (1988). The Emperor Maurice and his Historian – Theophylact Simocatta on Persian and Balkan Warfare. Oxford: Oxford University Press. ISBN 0-19-822945-3.
