= Tiberius II Constantine =

Roman emperor from 574 to 582

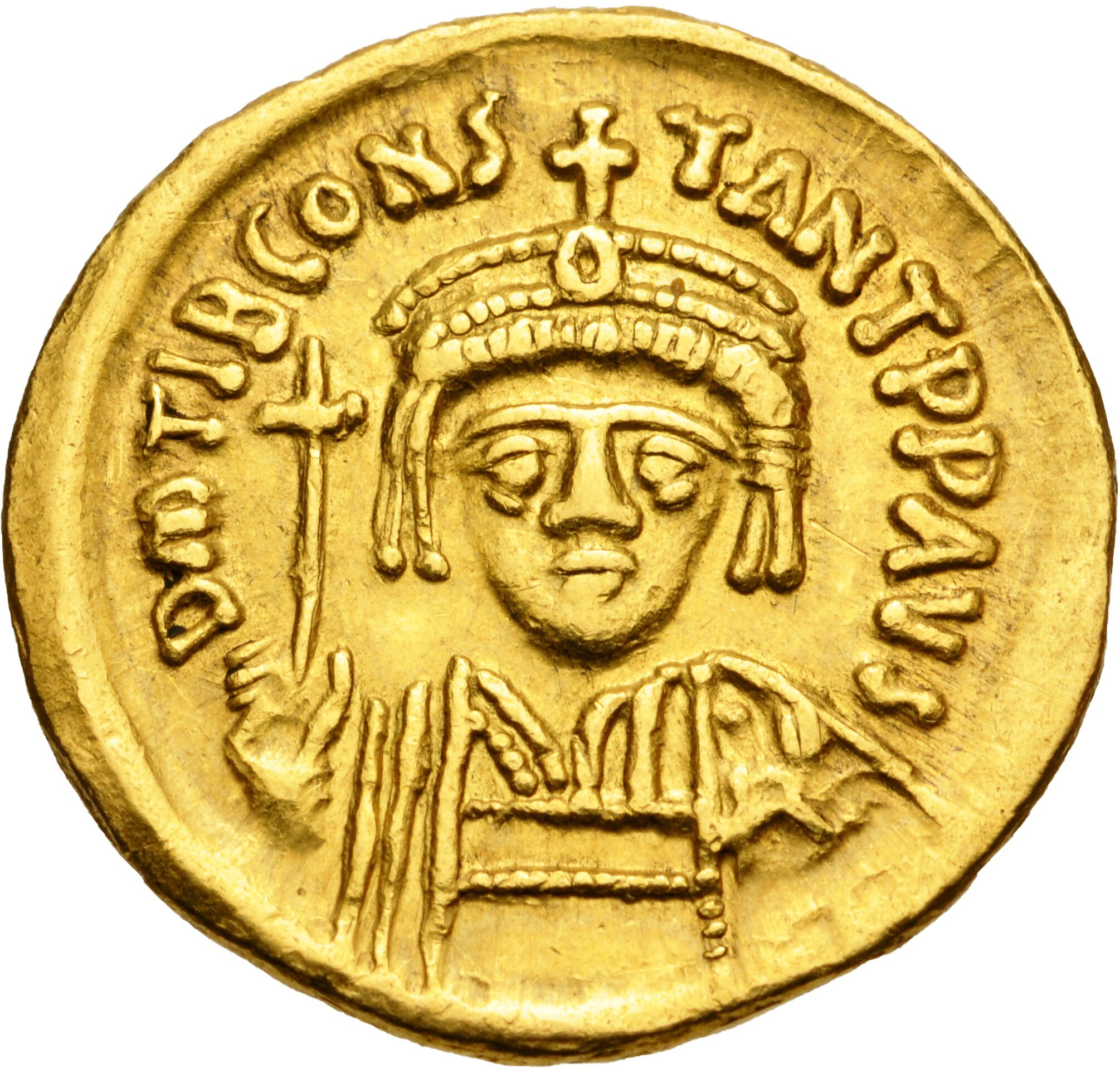
- Solidus of Tiberius II with the legend: d m tib constant pp aug

Byzantine emperor
- Augustus: 26 September 578 – 14 August 582
- Predecessor: Justin II
- Successor: Maurice
- Caesar: 7 December 574 – 578
- Born: Tiberius; Thrace
- Died: 14 August 582; Constantinople
- Spouse: Ino Anastasia
- Issue: Unknown issue; Charito; Constantina
Regnal name
- Imperator Caesar Flavius Tiberius Constantinus Augustus (Note: The full imperial titulature of Tiberius is attested in Greek as Αὐτοκράτωρ καῖσαρ Φλάβιος Τιβέριος Κωνσταντῖνος, πιστός ἐν Χριστῷ, ἡμερώτατος, μέγιστος εὐεργέτης, εἰρηνικός, ἀλαμαννικός, γοτθικός, φραγγικός, γερμανικός, ἀλανικός, οὐανδαλικός, ἀφρικός, εὐσεβής, εὐτυχής, ἔνδοξος, νικητής, τροπαιοῦχος, ἀεισέβαστος αὐγουστος ("Autokrator Caesar Flavius Tiberius Constantine, faithful in Christ, most mild, greatest benefactor, peaceable; victor over the Alamanni, Goths, Franks, Germans, Alans, Vandals, in Africa; pious, fortunate, renowned, victorious and triumphant, ever-venerable Augustus").)
- Dynasty: Justinian
- Father: Justin II (adoptive)
- Religion: Chalcedonian Christianity

Tiberius II Constantine (Note: Sometimes called Tiberius I, with the original Tiberius then being excluded from the count. In these listings, Tiberius III is enumerated as "Tiberius II" instead.) (Latin: Tiberius Cōnstantīnus; Ancient Greek: Τιβέριος Κωνσταντῖνος, romanized: Tibérios Kōnstantĩnos; (Note: Sometimes listed as Tiberius novus Constantinus (Ancient Greek: Τιβέριος νέος Κωνσταντῖνος, romanized: Tibérios néos Kōnstantĩnos) in older sources.) died 14 August 582) was Byzantine emperor from 578 to 582. Tiberius rose to power in 574 when Justin II, during an abatement in a period of severe mental illness, proclaimed him caesar and adopted him as his own son. In 578, the dying Justin II gave him the title of augustus, thus making Tiberius co-emperor alongside him. Tiberius became sole ruler less than two weeks later, assuming the regnal name of Constantine under which he reigned until his death. Tiberius' reign was marked by warfare with the Persians, as well as Avar incursions into the empire.

== Early career ==
Born in Thrace in the mid-6th century, Primary sources offer conflicting accounts of his origins. Evagrius Scholasticus recorded Tiberius as Thracian in his work Ecclesiastical History, while later Syriac tradition described him as of Greek nationality. The latter is considered by modern historians as an indication that he was a native Greek-speaker. Historian Warren Treadgold considers him of Illyrian origin, similar to Justinian I.

Tiberius was appointed to the post of notarius. There, sometime after 552, he was introduced by the Patriarch Eutychius to the future emperor, Justin II, with whom he became firm friends. Under Justin's patronage, Tiberius was promoted to the position of Comes excubitorum, which he held from approximately 565 through to 574. He was present during Justin's imperial accession on 14 November 565 and also attended his inauguration as consul on 1 January 566.

Justin ceased making payments to the Avars, which had been implemented by his predecessor, Justinian. In 569, he appointed Tiberius to the post of Magister utriusque militiae, with instructions to deal with the Avars and their demands. After a series of negotiations, Tiberius agreed to allow the Avars to settle on Roman territory in the Balkans, in exchange for male hostages taken from various Avar chiefs. Justin, however, rejected the agreement, insisting on taking hostages from the family of the Avar Khan himself. That condition was rejected by the Avars and so Tiberius mobilized for war.

== Avar War of 570 ==
In 570, he defeated an Avar army in Thrace and returned to Constantinople. While attempting to follow up that victory in late 570 or early 571, Tiberius was defeated in a battle in the Danube regions in which he narrowly escaped death, as his army was fleeing the battlefield. Agreeing to a truce, Tiberius provided an escort to the Avar envoys to discuss the terms of a treaty with Justin. On their return, the Avar envoys were attacked and robbed by local tribesmen, prompting them to appeal to Tiberius for help. He tracked down the group responsible and returned the stolen goods.

== Elevation as caesar (574–578) ==
In 574, Justin had a mental breakdown, forcing Empress Sophia to turn to Tiberius to manage the empire, which was fighting the Persians to the east and dealing with the internal crisis of the plague. To achieve a measure of breathing space, Tiberius and Sophia agreed to a one-year truce with the Persians, at the cost of 45,000 solidi. On 7 December 574, Justin, in one of his more lucid moments, had Tiberius proclaimed Caesar and adopted him as his own son. Tiberius added the name Constantine to his own. Although his position was now official, he was still subordinate to Justin. Sophia was determined to remain in power and kept Tiberius tightly controlled until Justin died, in 578.

The day after his appointment as Caesar, the plague abated, giving Tiberius more freedom of movement than Justin had been able to achieve. Tiberius also charted a very different course from his predecessor and proceeded to spend the money that Justin had saved in order to defend the imperial frontiers and win over the populace who had turned against him. According to Gregory of Tours, (Note: His account was repeated by Paul the Deacon.) who was based in Merovingian Gaul, Tiberius found two treasures: the treasure of Narses and 1,000 centenaria: 100,000 pounds of gold or 7,200,000 solidi (nomismata), under a slab. The treasures were given away to the poor, to the consternation of Sophia. John of Ephesus, a contemporary East Roman, wrote that Tiberius lavishly gave presents to "all men" and later as emperor, gave money away to the rich rather than the poor. During his time as caesar, his spending was opposed by Justin and Sophia, who set a ceiling for his expenditure and restricted his access to the treasury.

Alongside generous donations, Tiberius also proceeded to reduce state revenue by removing taxes on wine and bread instituted by Justinian I and continued Justin's ban on the sale of governorships. In 575, he remitted tax arrears down to 571 and reduced taxes by a quarter for four years.

He also negotiated a truce with the Avars, paying them 80,000 solidi per year for which the Avars agreed to defend the Danube frontier, thereby allowing Tiberius to transfer troops across to the east for a planned renewal of the conflict against the Persians. In 575, Tiberius began moving the armies of Thrace and Illyricum to the eastern provinces. Buying time to make the necessary preparations, he agreed to an additional truce with the Persians for three years, paying 30,000 solidi annually, though the truce excluded the wars in Armenia. Not content with making preparations, Tiberius also used this period to send reinforcements to Italy under the command of Baduarius with orders to stem the Lombard invasion. He saved Rome from the Lombards and allied the Empire with Childebert II, the King of the Franks, to defeat them. Unfortunately, Baduarius was defeated and killed in 576, allowing even more imperial territory in Italy to slip away. Tiberius was unable to respond as the Sassanid Emperor Khosrau I struck at the empire's Armenian provinces in 576, sacking Melitene and Sebastea. Shifting his attention eastward, Tiberius sent his general Justinian with the eastern armies to push Khosrau and the Persians back across the Euphrates. The Byzantines led by Justinian pushed deep into Persian territory, culminating in a raid on Atropatene. In 577, however, Justinian was defeated in Persian Armenia, forcing a Byzantine withdrawal. In response to that defeat, Tiberius replaced Justinian with the future emperor Maurice. During the truce that Tiberius concluded with Khosrau, he busily enhanced the army of the east not only with transfers from his western armies but also through barbarian recruits, which he formed into a new foederati unit, amounting to some 15,000 troops by the end of his reign.

Throughout 577 and into 578, Tiberius avoided all other entanglements that would have distracted him from the approaching Persian conflict. He appeased, quite successfully, both Chalcedonian and Monophysite Christians by the use of strategic appointments and the easing of persecutions. He paid the Lombard tribal chieftains some 200,000 nomismata in an attempt to keep them divided and to prevent the election of a king. When the Slavs invaded Illyricum, he transported Avar armies to attack them and force their retreat. Consequently, when Khosrau invaded Roman Mesopotamia in 578, his general, Maurice, was able to invade Persian Arzanene and Mesopotamia, sacking a number of key towns and forcing the Persians to abandon their advance and defend their own territory. It was during that period that the ailing emperor, Justin, finally died on 5 October 578.

== Reign as augustus (578–582) ==
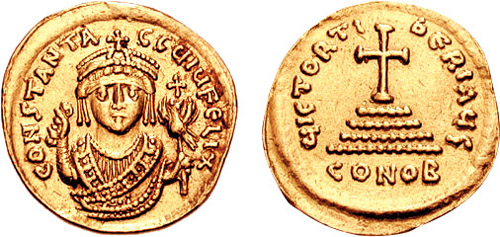
Solidus of Tiberius II Constantine in consular uniform

On 26 September 578, Tiberius was made Augustus by the rapidly failing Justin. He used that opportunity to give away 7,200 pounds of gold, a practice that he continued annually throughout the four years of his reign.

Sophia, Justin's widow, tried to maintain her power and influence by marrying the new emperor, but he refused her proposal because he was already married to Ino. When Tiberius had first been raised to the rank of Caesar, Sophia had refused the request for Ino and her children to move into the Imperial palace with her husband, forcing them to reside in a small residence nearby and prohibiting them from entering the palace. Once Tiberius was elevated to the rank of Augustus, however, he had his family moved into the palace and renamed Ino as Anastasia, much to Sophia's resentment. Therefore, Sophia sought revenge, and a secret pact was made between the dowager empress and general Justinian, whom Tiberius had replaced the year before. They conspired to overthrow the emperor and seat Justinian in his place. The conspiracy failed, however, and Sophia was reduced to a modest allowance; Justinian was forgiven by Tiberius.

The ongoing success against the Persians in the East once again allowed Tiberius to turn his gaze westward. In 579, he again extended his military activities into the remnants of the Western Roman Empire. He sent money and troops to Italy to reinforce Ravenna and to retake the port of Classis. He formed an alliance with one of the Visigothic princes in Spain, who was fomenting rebellion, and his general Gennadius defeated the rebellious Berbers under their king Garmul in North Africa. He also intervened in Frankish affairs in the former province of Gaul, which had been largely free of imperial contacts for close to a century. Consequently, he might have been the basis for the fictional emperor Lucius Tiberius of Arthurian legend, who sent envoys to former Roman provinces after a long period without an imperial presence.

It has been argued that the empire was seriously overextended. In 579, with Tiberius occupied elsewhere, the Avars decided to take advantage of the lack of troops in the Balkans by besieging Sirmium. At the same time, up to 100,000 Slavs began to migrate into Thrace, Macedonia and southern Greece, which Tiberius was unable to halt as the Persians refused to agree to a peace in the east, which remained the emperor's main priority. Furthermore, the army of the East was beginning to become restless, as it had not been paid, and it threatened to mutiny.

In 580, general Maurice launched a new offensive, raiding well beyond the Tigris. The following year, he again invaded Persian Armenia and almost succeeded in reaching the Persian capital, Ctesiphon, before a Persian counterinvasion of Byzantine Mesopotamia forced him to withdraw in order to deal with that threat. By 582, with no apparent end to the Persian war in sight, Tiberius was forced to come to terms with the Avars, and he agreed to resume the payments, including back payments for the siege, and hand over the vital city of Sirmium, which the Avars then looted. The migration of the Slavs continued, with their incursions reaching as far south as Athens. Although a new Persian invasion was halted with a significant defeat at Constantina in June 582, by now, Tiberius was dying, apparently having eaten some poorly prepared food.

In this state, Tiberius initially named two heirs, each of whom married one of his daughters. Maurice was betrothed to Constantina, and Germanus, related to emperor Justinian, was married to Charito. Some historians believe that his plan was to divide the empire in two, with Maurice receiving the eastern provinces and Germanus the western provinces. This plan was never implemented. On 11 August 582, only Maurice is recorded as Caesar in the subscription of a law of Tiberius, and on 13 August 582, Tiberius elevated Maurice to the rank of Augustus.

Tiberius died on the following day, 14 August 582.

== Legacy ==
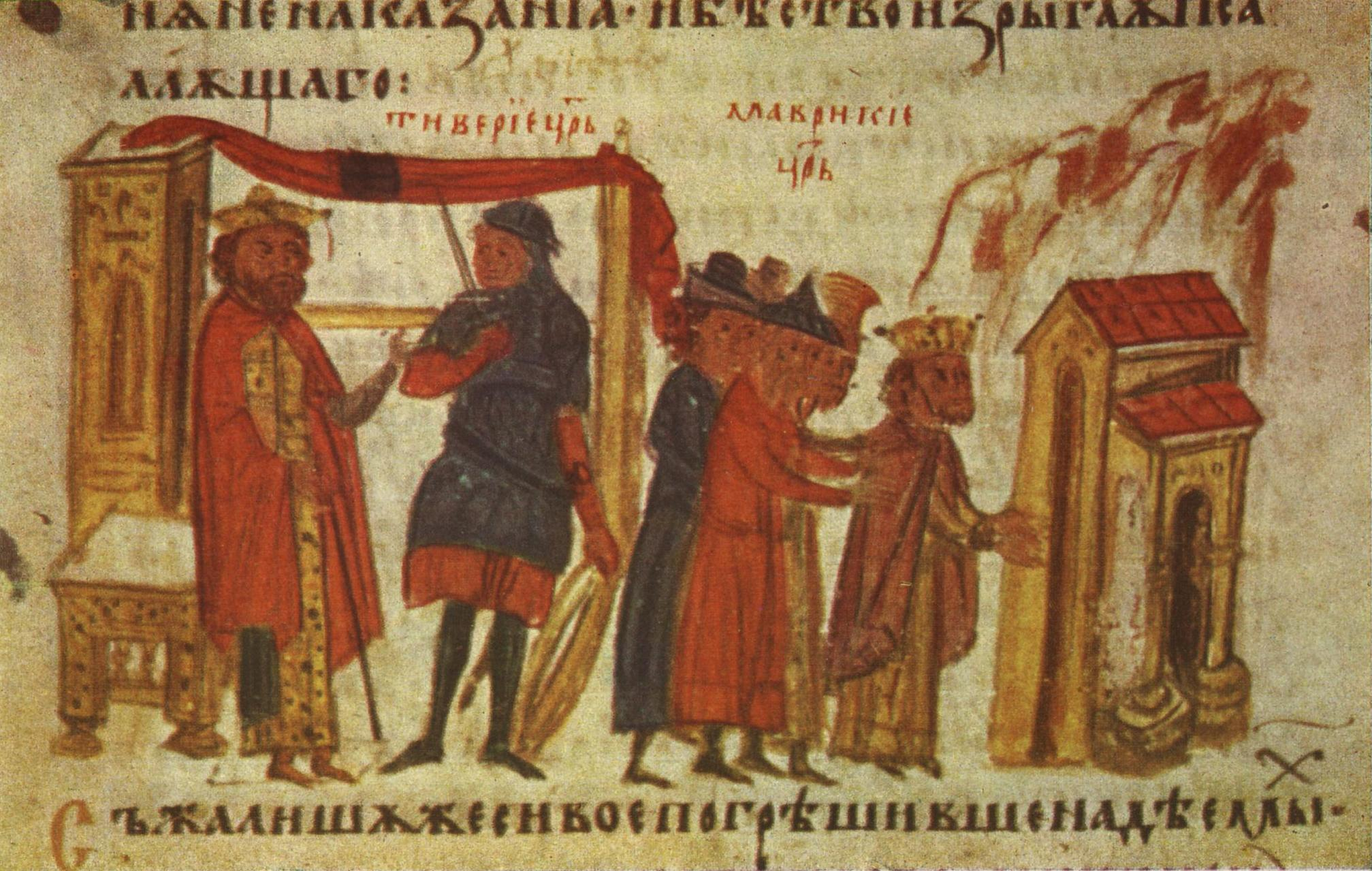
Miniature of Tiberius II (left) from the 12th century Manasses Chronicle.

A native of the Latin-speaking part of Thrace, Tiberius reportedly was tall and handsome, with a regal bearing. He was gentle and humane, both as a man and a ruler, with a reputation for generosity. Unlike his predecessor, he largely refrained from persecuting his Monophysite subjects, but his Arian subjects in the west did not fare as well. He also spent a good deal of money on building projects, most notably the continued expansion of the Great Palace of Constantinople.

In the 18th century, Edward Gibbon assessed Tiberius II as a model emperor who benevolently distributed wealth to the population. (Note: "With the odious name of Tiberius, he assumed the more popular appellation of Constantine, and imitated the purer virtues of the Antonines. After recording the vice or folly of so many Roman princes, it is pleasing to repose, for a moment, on a character conspicuous by the qualities of humanity, justice, temperance, and fortitude; to contemplate a sovereign affable in his palace, pious in the church, impartial on the seat of judgment, and victorious, at least by his generals, in the Persian war. The most glorious trophy of his victory consisted in a multitude of captives, whom Tiberius entertained, redeemed, and dismissed to their native homes with the charitable spirit of a Christian hero. The merit or misfortunes of his own subjects had a dearer claim to his beneficence, and he measured his bounty not so much by their expectations as by his own dignity. This maxim, however dangerous in a trustee of the public wealth, was balanced by a principle of humanity and justice, which taught him to abhor, as of the basest alloy, the gold that was extracted from the tears of the people. For their relief, as often as they had suffered by natural or hostile calamities, he was impatient to remit the arrears of the past, or the demands of future taxes: he sternly rejected the servile offerings of his ministers, which were compensated by tenfold oppression; and the wise and equitable laws of Tiberius excited the praise and regret of succeeding times. Constantinople believed that the emperor had discovered a treasure: but his genuine treasure consisted in the practice of liberal economy, and the contempt of all vain and superfluous expense. The Romans of the East would have been happy, if the best gift of Heaven, a patriot king, had been confirmed as a proper and permanent blessing. But in less than four years after the death of Justin, his worthy successor sunk into a mortal disease, which left him only sufficient time to restore the diadem, according to the tenure by which he held it, to the most deserving of his fellow-citizens.")

That opinion was not shared by John Bagnall Bury in the 19th century, who criticized Tiberius as fiscally irresponsible. (Note: "But though he might have made a very good minister of war, Tiberius did not make a good Emperor. It was natural that his first acts should be reactionary, as Justin's government had been extremely unpopular. He removed the duty on the "political bread", and remitted a fourth part of the taxes throughout the Empire. Had he been contented with this he might deserve praise, but he began a system of most injudicious extravagance. He gratified the soldiers with large and frequent Augustatica, and he granted donations to members of all the professions--scholastics or jurists ("a very numerous profession"), physicians, silversmiths, bankers. This liberality soon emptied the treasury of its wealth. . . . The result was that by the end of the first year of his reign he had spent 7200 lbs. of gold, beside silver and silk in abundance; and before he died he was obliged to have recourse to the reserve fund which the prudent economy of Anastasius had laid by, to be used in the case of an extreme emergency. And, notwithstanding these financial difficulties, he laid out money on new buildings in the palace. The consequence of this recklessness was that when Maurice came to the throne he found the exchequer empty and the State bankrupt. . . . There is considerable reason, I think, to remove Tiberius from his pedestal.) Warren Treadgold suggests that although Tiberius had left the empire a little stronger, his exorbitant spending made the empire's financial situation worse, and due to the empty treasury, his successor Maurice had to be thriftier, leading to the implementation of unpopular wage cuts and policies in an attempt to economise.

== Family ==
Originally betrothed as a young man to the daughter of Ino, Tiberius eventually married Ino after her daughter and husband died. She took on the name Anastasia in 578 after his accession to the throne.

They had three children together, one of whom died before Tiberius was created Caesar in 574. Of his other two, both daughters, Constantina was married to Tiberius's successor, Maurice, and Charito was married to Germanus. His wife and two daughters all outlived him.

== Sources ==
- Bury, J.B. (1889). A History of the Later Roman Empire from Arcadius to Irene, 395 A.D. to 800 A.D. Vol. II. MacMillan & Co. OCLC 168739195.
- Kazhdan, Alexander, ed. (1991). The Oxford Dictionary of Byzantium. Oxford and New York: Oxford University Press. ISBN 0-19-504652-8.
- Martindale, John R., ed. (1992). The Prosopography of the Later Roman Empire: Volume III, AD 527–641. Cambridge: Cambridge University Press. ISBN 0-521-20160-8.
- Kaldellis, Anthony (2023). The New Roman Empire. Oxford University Press.
- Meyendorff, John (1989). Imperial unity and Christian divisions: The Church 450–680 A.D. The Church in history. Vol. 2. Crestwood, NY: St. Vladimir's Seminary Press. ISBN 978-0-88-141056-3.
- Norwich, John Julius (1990). Byzantium: The Early Centuries. Penguin Books.
- Ostrogorsky, George (1956). History of the Byzantine State. Oxford: Basil Blackwell.
- Rösch, Gerhard (1978). Onoma Basileias: Studien zum offiziellen Gebrauch der Kaisertitel in spätantiker und frühbyzantinischer Zeit. Byzantina et Neograeca Vindobonensia (in German). Verlag der österreichischen Akademie der Wissenschaften. ISBN 978-3-7001-0260-1.
- Sodini, Jean-Pierre (1973). "Une titulature faussement attribuée à Justinien Ier. Remarque sur une inscription trouvée à Kythrea, Chypre". Travaux et Mémoires du Centre de Recherche d'Histoire et Civilisation de Byzance (in French). Vol. 5. pp. 373–384.
- Treadgold, Warren (1997). A History of the Byzantine State and Society. Stanford University Press.
- Edward Walford, translator (1846) The Ecclesiastical History of Evagrius: A History of the Church from AD 431 to AD 594, Reprinted 2008. Evolution Publishing, ISBN 978-1-889758-88-6.
- Gibbon, Edward. "Chapter 45". The History of the Decline and Fall of the Roman Empire. Archived from the original on 13 December 2012.
- Paul the Deacon. "Book III, Chapters 11–15". Historia Langobardorum.
- Theophylact Simocatta, History

Tiberius II Constantine Justinian dynasty Died: 582
Regnal titles
Preceded by Justin II	Byzantine emperor 578–582 with Justin II (578); Maurice (582)	Succeeded by Maurice
Political offices
Preceded by Justinus Augustus in 568	Roman consul 579	Succeeded by Mauricius Tiberius Augustus in 584
