= Harbor of Eutropius =

Byzantine harbor in Asia Minor opposite Constantinople

The Harbor of Eutropius (Ancient Greek: λιμήν Εὑτροπίου) was an artificial harbor east of Chalcedon (modern-day Kalamış), along the coast of Asia Minor, during the Byzantine Empire. It was constructed by order of Byzantine Emperor Justinian (r. 527–565), made of large moles of black stone. It was likely the smallest of the harbors opposite the Byzantine capital Constantinople, and served an unknown function. The harbor was the location for the execution of Emperor Maurice (r. 582–602), along with his sons, and later, the female members of his family. During the Siege of Constantinople of 717–718, the harbor was one of the landing grounds of the invading Umayyad forces. With the expansion of the maritime districts of nearby Kalamış and Fenerbahçe in modern times, nothing remains of the harbor.

== History ==
The Harbor of Eutropius was placed east of Chalcedon (modern-day Kalamış), along the coast of Asia Minor in lands possessed by the Byzantine Empire. At the time of its construction, there was no permanent land connection between Constantinople and its Asia Minor counterparts, a situation which continued until 1973, when the Bosphorus Bridge was completed. At most two prior attempts had been made to link the two lands in antiquity, both of which took the form of pontoon bridges, intended for only a single use: once in 513 BC and a second one was allegedly made in 641 AD, although the narrative behind the second has been challenged. The trade between Constantinople and its adjacent suburbs was significant and important in antiquity, and much of the travel from Constantinople to the eastern provinces involved sailing across the Bosphorus from Constantinople to one of the harbors of the directly opposite suburbs, which still belonged to the capital. The Harbor of Eutropius was the least important of the four, behind the Chalcedon, Chrysopolis, and Hieria harbors.

The Harbor of Eutropius was almost entirely artificial, built by order of Emperor Justinian (r. 527–565) out of large moles of black stone, in a similar manner as the Harbor of Hieria. It was located on a mostly straight coastline, with a mild west-facing embayment. It was placed between the harbors of Chalcedon and Hieria, it was only 800 metres (2,600 ft) from Hieria, and near the Church of St John Chrysostom, which was destroyed in the early 20th century. It was not named after the eunuch Eutropius, or a later protospatharios Eutropius, but was named for the district in which it was located; however, some sources incorrectly report that it was built under either Emperors Zeno (r. 474–475, 476–491) and Anastasius I Dicorus (r. 491–518), or Constantine the Great (r. 306–337). It was likely the smallest of the harbors opposite Constantinople, and its exact usage is unknown. The Byzantinist Klaus Belke has suggested it was a tertiary harbor for Chalcedon or may have primarily served to supply the imperial summer palace at Hieria.

In 602, the military officer Phocas (r. 602–610) overthrew Maurice (r. 582–602), and had him and his sons executed at the Harbor of Eutropius; Phocas would later execute the female members of Maurice's family at the harbor in either 605 or 607. During the Siege of Constantinople in 717–718, the Umayyad Caliphate's fleet, supposedly numbering 1,800 ships, dispersed to the various harbors and landing grounds near Constantinople, choosing the harbor of Eutropius and the Harbor of Anthemius for the Asian portion of the invasion; however, neither harbors are referred to by name in the sources, and only the locations associated with them are given. The 10th-century Saint Luke the Stylite lived as a stylite (on top of a column) near the harbor, from 935 until his death in 975. He was succeeded by the anonymous author of the Vita of the Stylite, who immediately sailed from Constantinople to the harbor and took up the same column as a dwelling place; he would remain there until 989, when the column was torn away into the ocean, likely by a storm surge, causing him to drown.

The 16th-century French topographer Petrus Gyllius evidently did not succeed in locating the ruins of the harbor of Eutropius, as he misplaces it on the west bank of the bay, either between the Moda Burnu and the mouth of the Chalcedon River, which was in truth the Harbor of Eirene, or where the Harbor of Chalcedon was. Due to the recent growth of the maritime districts of Kalamış and Fenerbahçe, nothing remains of the Harbor of Eutropius.
