= Monastery of Saint Mamas =

The Monastery of Saint Mamas (Greek: Ἅγιος Μάμας) was a monastery in the Byzantine capital, Constantinople, supposedly first founded in the 6th century, in honor of the 3rd century martyr Mammes of Caesarea, and surviving until the end of the 14th century.

== History ==
The monastery was located in the southwestern part of the city, near the Xylokerkos Gate in the Theodosian Walls. According to later tradition, it was founded in the 6th century, either by a chamberlain of Emperor Justinian I (r. 527–565) called Pharasmanes, or slightly later by Gordia, sister of Emperor Maurice (r. 582–602). Certainly Maurice's family was associated with the monastery in some form, possibly using it as their family mausoleum: both Maurice and his wife, Empress Constantina, were buried there.

Having fallen into decline, the monastery was restored in the late 10th century by Symeon the New Theologian, who served as its abbot for 25 years. By the 12th century, the monastery had once again declined, reportedly because the charistikiarioi, laymen who managed the monastery's estates, abused their position. It was rescued by the mystikos George Kappadokes, who restored the monastery complex and secured its position via a chrysobull from Emperor Manuel I Komnenos (r. 1143–1180). In the course of this process, in 1158 the abbot Athanasios Philanthropenos composed a new charter (typikon) for the monastery, based on the model of the mid-11th century (1049) Theotokos Euergetis Monastery, also located in or around Constantinople.

The monastery is known to have survived at least until 1399.

== Sources ==
- Talbot, Alice-Mary (1991). "Mamas, Monastery of Saint". In Kazhdan, Alexander (ed.). The Oxford Dictionary of Byzantium. Oxford and New York: Oxford University Press. p. 1278. ISBN 0-19-504652-8.
