= Evagrius Scholasticus =

6th-century Syrian scholar and intellectual

- Born: c. 536; Epiphania, Byzantine Empire
- Died: 594
- Occupations: Scholar and intellectual
- Writing career
- Notable work: Ecclesiastical History

Evagrius Scholasticus (Greek: Εὐάγριος Σχολαστικός) was a Syrian scholar and intellectual living in the 6th century AD, and an aide to the patriarch Gregory of Antioch. His surviving work, Ecclesiastical History (Ἐκκλησιαστικὴ Ἱστορία), comprises a six-volume collection concerning the Church's history from the First Council of Ephesus (431) to the emperor Maurice’s reign until Scholasticus' death.

== Life ==
Evagrius Scholasticus was born in Epiphania, a Syrian town located next to the Orontes River in the heart of the Eastern Roman Empire. Glenn Chesnut gives his date of birth as either 536 or 537; Michael Whitby says "about 535". His first written work addressed the plague outbreak which infected a vast segment of the population. Evagrius himself was infected by the outbreak during his youth yet managed to survive it. According to his own account, close members of his family died from the outbreak, including his wife at the time. Michael Whitby reasons that Evagrius was born into a wealthy aristocratic family with close ties to the political elite.

His education was long-ranging and comprehensive since early childhood, starting with a specialization in grammar and transitioning to classical Greek literature. This eventually culminated in Evagrius’s pursuit of legal studies, which upon completion, earned him the prestigious title of “Scholasticus” when he was in his late 20s. His first notable official endeavor was accompanying Gregory of Antioch to Constantinople in order to defend him against charges related to sexual misbehavior. Evagrius again remarried in Antioch, where his own records testify to his prestige among the professional elite since displays of grandeur and a massive audience were present during this wedding ceremony. Dedicated to the emperor Maurice Evagrius wrote many works on theological matters, but none of these survive. His remaining work, The Ecclesiastical History was complete in 593, a six-volume compilation of Christian history from the first Council of Ephesus to his own present time.

Evagrius was explicitly a Christian in the Chalcedonian tradition, critiquing both Zacharias Rhetor and Zosimus for theological differences, two popular historians during his own time. He respected the former scholar for his contributions to the histories of the 5th and 6th centuries AD but chastised him for his Monophysite position. However, he was especially hostile towards Zosimus, a pagan historiographer, for his vehemently anti-Christian views, stating “ ‘You, O accursed and totally defiled one, say that the fortunes of the Romans wasted away and were altogether ruined from the time when Christianity was made known”, challenging Zosimus's assumption that Rome's fall began with Constantine's conversion.

== Works ==
=== Ecclesiastical History ===
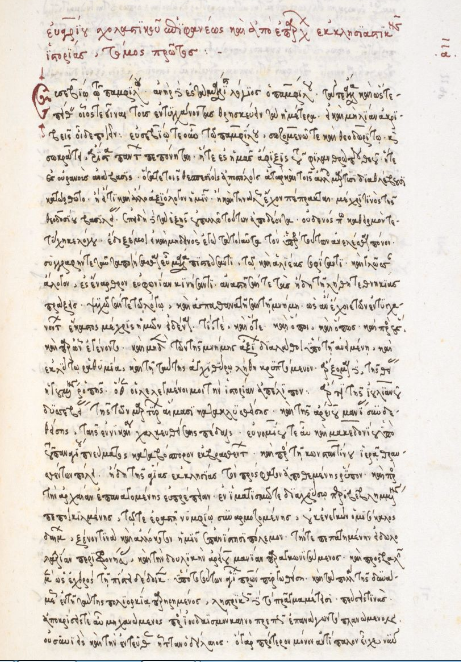
Evagrius Scholasticus, Historia ecclesiastica (1524 copy; British Library Egerton MS 2626)

Evagrius's only surviving work, Ecclesiastical History, addresses the history of the Eastern Roman Empire from the beginning before the Nestorian controversy at the First Council of Ephesus in 431 to the time in which he was writing, 593. The book's contents focus mainly on religious matters, describing the events surrounding notable bishops and holy men.

The editio princeps was published in 1544 under the name of Robertus Stephanus (better known as Robert Estienne). John Christopherson, bishop of Chichester, made a Latin translation of the Ecclesiastical History, which was published after his death in 1570. Translations into English appeared much later: the first was by Edward Walford, which was published at London in 1846; Michael Whitby's translation was published in 2001 by Liverpool University Press as part of their "Texts in Translation Series."

Some historians, particularly Pauline Allen, allege that Evagrius's Chalcedonian theological stance directly influenced his selection of information, in order to defend Chalcedonian-aligned political agents against negative reputation. Whitby, however, emphasizes the legal scholar's acceptance and inclusion of information written by other historians who adopted opposing stances, when he discerned that their accounts were reliable. For example, Evagrius Scholasticus relies heavily on Zachariah's textual study of history even though he was a monophysite, occasionally omitting minor facets of his work that explicitly promote his theology, but largely considering him to be dependable. Allen also reasons that Evagrius built on Zachariah's work because his was the only comprehensive historical account of events taking place from Theodoret of Cyrus’s time till his own era. Unfortunately, however, Zachariah’s original manuscripts have been lost.

Evagrius is much less critical of the Emperor Justinian and his wife Theodora, in comparison with Procopius, who described the two as physically manifest demons. Because of regional affiliations Evagrius depicts the emperor in a more sympathetic light, praising his moderate approach to justice and his restraint towards excessive persecution, yet still decrying his heresy and displays of wealth. Evagrius’s ambivalence to Justinian is especially evident when he describes him as a virtuous man yet blind to impending defeat in his self-initiated war with Persia. Chesnut also comments on how the Roman historian and scholar endues his Ecclesiastical History with a dramatic style, using themes from classical Greek tragedies to characterize Justinian’s life, particularly Fortune’s grand fluctuations.

Evagrius builds upon the documents written by Zachariah, Symeon Stylites the Elder, Eustathius of Epiphania, John Malalas, Zosimus, and Procopius of Caesarea.

The Ecclesiastical History is considered an important and relatively authoritative account of the timeline it traces, since Evagrius draws on other scholars’ material, explicitly acknowledging his sources. He meticulously organizes information taken from other written historical works in order to validate his account more effectively than other theological scholars of his time, thus diminishing confusion for future historian's interested in studying his work. However, historians acknowledge that there are serious logical errors inherent in Evagrius's surviving work, which is common for its epoch, namely the problematic chronological sequencing and skimming over of undeniably notable events such as major wars and other secular events. When the scholar mentions important occasions in his own life, lack of chronological labeling is especially evident – which can provide complications to those analyzing his book.
