= Baduarius (curator) =

Baduarius (Greek: Βαδουάριος) is a figure of 6th century Constantinople, known only from a single inscription in an epitaph.

The inscription is written in the Greek language, mentioning the glorious memory of Baduarius and Theodora. His title is rendered in Latin as "curator domus rerum Areobindi" (caretaker of the house of Areobindus). The wording suggests that said house was no longer owned by anyone called Areobindus. It was probably an estate that had passed to "imperial ownership". Baduarius either being a caretaker in imperial service or someone granted ownership at some point.

The Theodora mentioned in the inscription could be Baduarius' wife. There are theories identifying this man with Baduarius, son-in-law of Justin II and Sophia. However, the only known wife of the other Baduarius is called "Arabia", not Theodora.

== Sources ==
- Martindale, John R., ed. (1992). The Prosopography of the Later Roman Empire: Volume III, AD 527–641. Cambridge: Cambridge University Press. ISBN 0-521-20160-8.
