= Helena (niece of Justin II) =

Niece of Byzantine Empress Sophia

Helena (Greek: Ἑλένη) was a niece of Byzantine Empress Sophia, the wife of Emperor Justin II. She is known only because of Georgios Kedrenos and the Suda. They mention a statue of her in the Milion, alongside statues of Sophia and Arabia of Justin II.

== Sources ==
- Janin, Raymond (1950). Constantinople Byzantine. Paris: Institut Français d'Etudes Byzantines.
- Martindale, John R., ed. (1992). The Prosopography of the Later Roman Empire: Volume III, AD 527–641. Cambridge: Cambridge University Press. ISBN 0-521-20160-8.
