= Baduarius (disambiguation) =

Baduarius may refer to:

- Baduarius (Scythia), 6th century Byzantine general active in Scythia Minor
- Baduarius, 6th century Byzantine curopalates, son-in-law of Justin II and Sophia
- Baduarius (curator), 6th century figure recorded as "curator domus rerum Areobindi"
