= Milion =

Byzantine mile-marker monument in Constantinople

Coordinates: 41°00′29″N 28°58′41″E

Reconstruction of Byzantion's Milion based on historic accounts and remaining fragments. The arched structure is approximately 14.6 m wide.

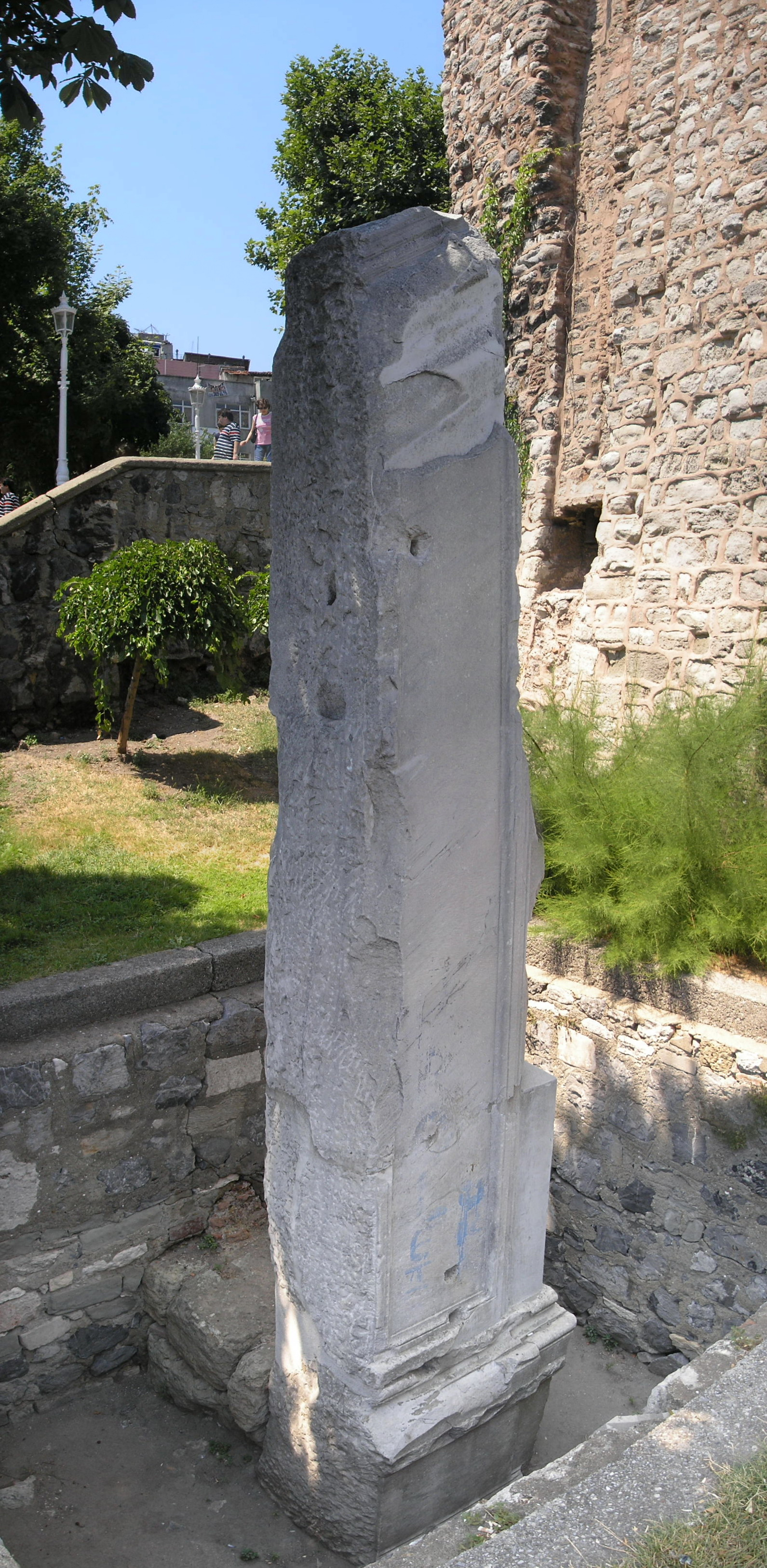
A fragment of the Milion has been re-erected as a pillar.

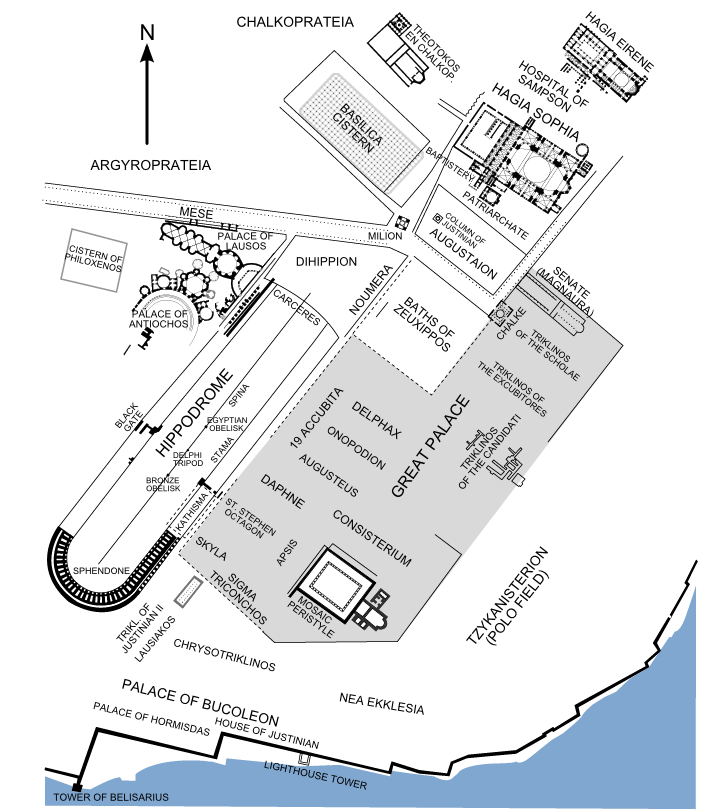
Milion can be seen at the center of the plaza near the Hippodrome.

The Milion (Ancient Greek: Μίλιον or Μίλλιον, Mílion; Turkish: Milyon taşı) was a marker from which all distances across the Roman Empire were measured. Erected by Septimius Severus in the 3rd century AD in the city of Byzantium, it became the zero-mile marker for the empire upon the re-founding of the city as Constantinople in 330 AD. Thereafter, it would serve as the starting-place for the measurement of distances for all the roads leading to the cities of the Eastern Roman Empire. It thus served the same function as the Golden Milestone (Milliarium Aureum) in Rome's forum, erected by Augustus. The domed building of the Milion rested on four large arches and, over the centuries, it was expanded and decorated with several statues and paintings. Though it had survived the sack of Constantinople in 1204 and the Ottoman conquest of Constantinople in 1453, it disappeared by the start of the 16th century in the Ottoman era. During excavations in the 1960s, some partial fragments of the Milion were discovered under houses in the area.

== Location ==
The remains of the monument are located in Istanbul, in the district of Eminönü, in the neighborhood of Cağaloğlu, at the northern corner of the square of Hagia Sophia, and close to the Basilica Cistern.

== History and description ==
The mother of all milestones, the Milion, erected by Septimius Severus, would be considered a kind of ground zero for civilisation and it marks the moment when Byzantium truly becomes a topographical and cultural reference point. Built in the first Region of the city, near the old Walls of Byzantium at the very beginning of the main thoroughfare of the new city, the Mese (Μέση Οδός), which at that point formed a bend. (Bettany Hughes, 2017)

When Emperor Constantine I the Great rebuilt the city of Byzantium to make it his new imperial capital, which he named Nova Roma ("New Rome"), he consciously emulated many of the features of "Old Rome". Among these was the modification of the Milion; it was tetrapylon surmounted with a dome. The refurbished building fulfilled the same role as the Milliarium Aureum in Rome: it was considered as the origin of all the roads leading to the European cities of the Byzantine Empire, and on its base were inscribed the distances of all the main cities of the Empire from Constantinople. The monument was just west of the Augustaeum, and was much more complex than its Roman counterpart. It can be described as a double triumphal arch surmounted by a dome, which was carried by four arches. It was crowned by the statues of Constantine and his mother Helena with a cross, looking towards the east, between them. A statue of the Tyche of the City stood behind them.

From the beginning of the sixth century, the building became an increasingly important station of the imperial ceremonial. Justinian I added to it a Sundial, while Justin II adorned the lower part with the statues of his wife Sophia, his daughter Arabia and his niece Helena. The monument was also adorned with equestrian sculptures of Trajan, Hadrian, Theodosius II and a bronze Quadriga of Helios.

During the first half of the eighth century, the vaults of the building were adorned by Emperors Philippikos and Anastasios II with paintings of past ecumenical councils, but during the Iconoclastic Age, Emperor Constantine V replaced them with scenes from the Hippodrome.

During the Comnenian Age, the Milion, due to its strategic position, witnessed fights in the city, like those between Nikephoros III and Alexios I, or those between imperial troops and Empress Maria of Antioch, who from this position was controlling the Augustaeum.

In the period 1268 to 1271, after the end of the Latin Empire, the Milion—together with the Augustaeum—became the property of the church of Hagia Sophia.

After the Ottoman conquest of Constantinople (1453), the building remained intact up to the end of the fifteenth century. It disappeared possibly at the beginning of the sixteenth century because of the enlargement of the nearby aqueduct and the subsequent erection of the nearby suterazi (Turkish: "water tower", lit. "water scale").

In the years 1967 and 1968, following theoretical studies about the location of the monument and after the demolition of the houses placed above it, excavations revealed some foundations and a fragment (now re-erected as a pillar) belonging to the building. These remains could be positively identified as belonging to the Milion thanks to their vicinity to a part of bent Byzantine canalization. This seems to indicate the angle of the disappeared Mese, as reported by the literary sources.

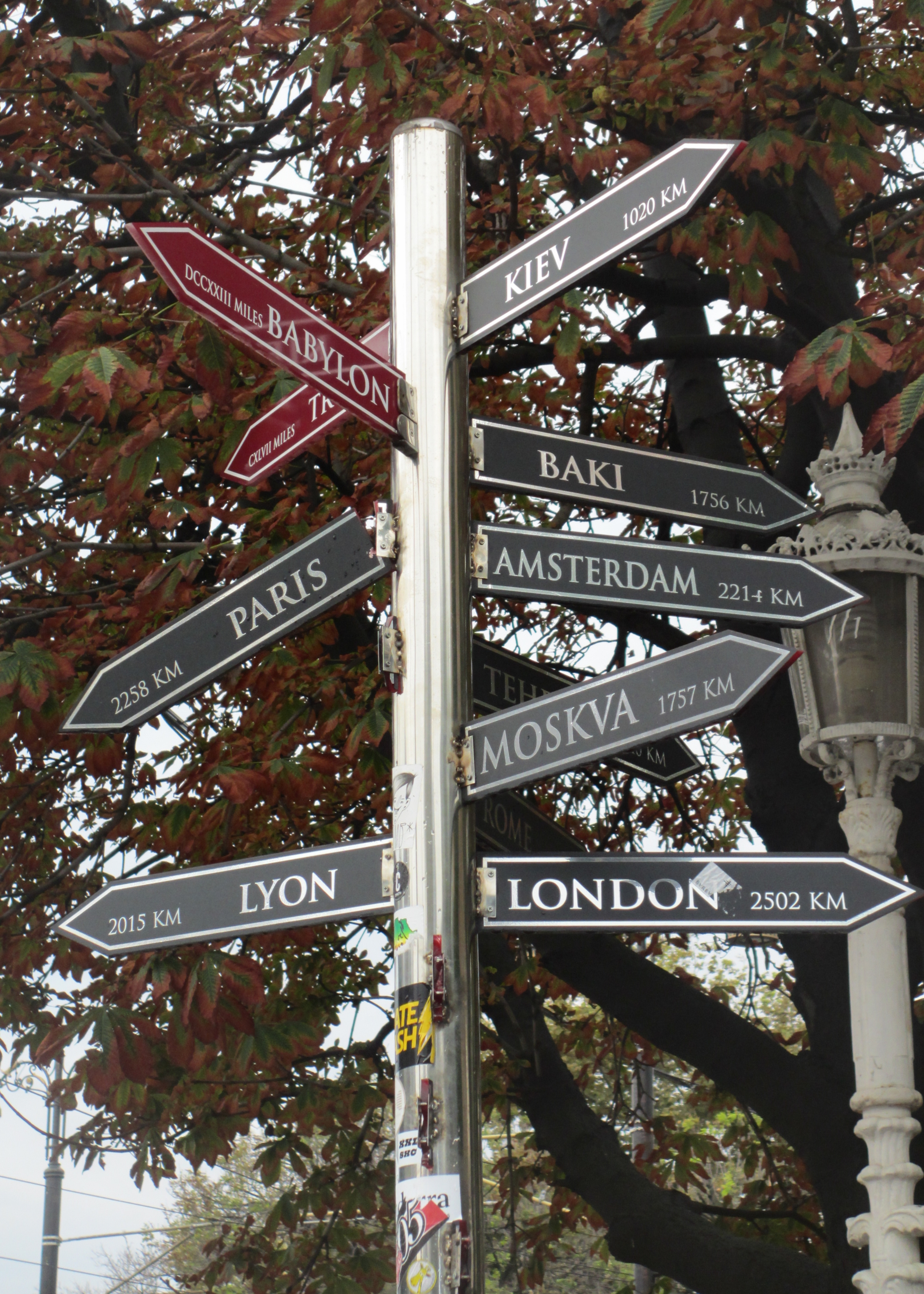
Distances of major modern cities from the Milion.

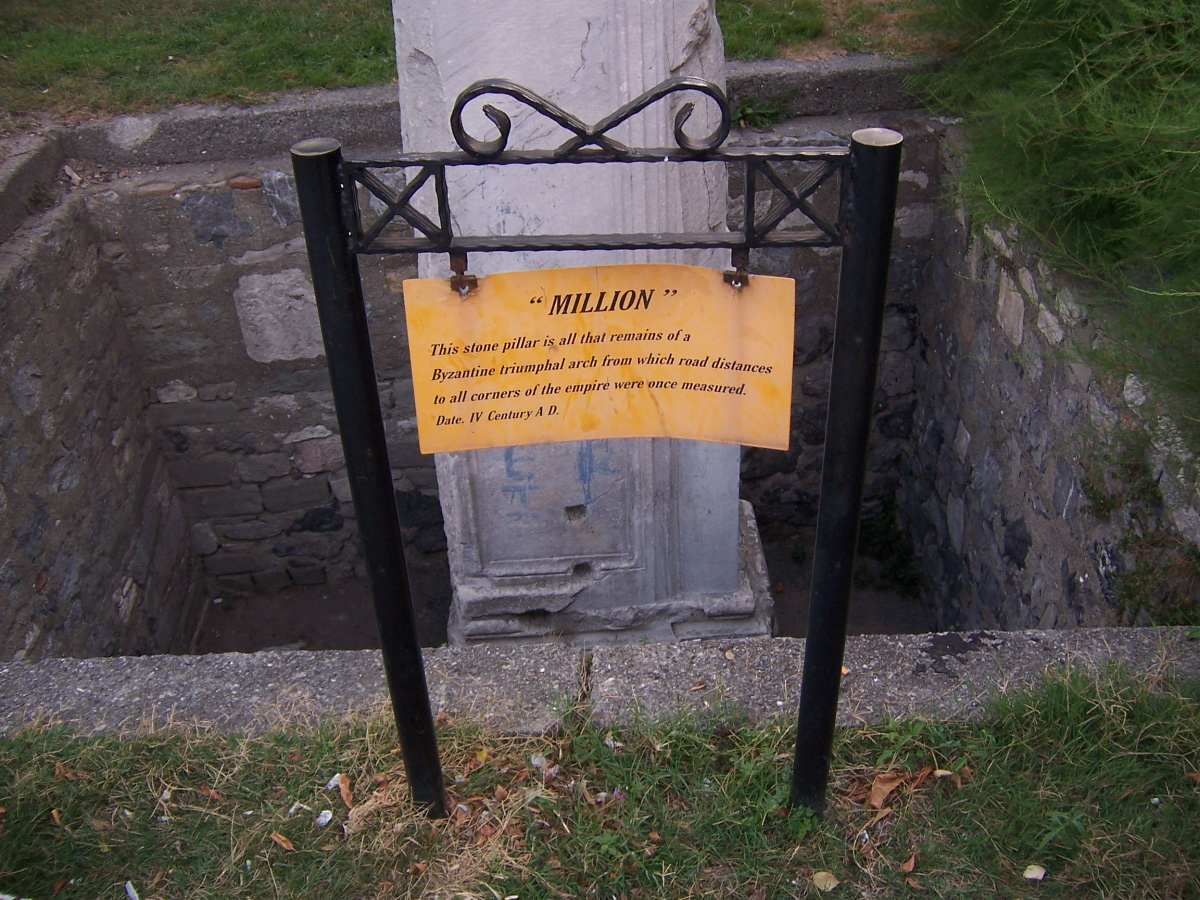
The label on the remains of the Milion

== See also ==
- Umbilicus urbis Romae

== Sources ==
- Janin, Raymond (1950). Constantinople Byzantine (in French). Paris: Institut Français d'Etudes Byzantines.
- Müller-Wiener, Wolfgang (1977). Bildlexikon zur Topographie Istanbuls: Byzantion, Konstantinupolis, Istanbul bis zum Beginn d. 17 Jh. Tübingen: Wasmuth. ISBN 978-3-8030-1022-3.
