= Ielidassen =

Ielidassen (6th century) was a Moorish warrior whose name appears in the sixth century in the Iohannis of the Latin poet Corippus.

During the battle of Campi Mammenses, in southern Tunisia, the Roman Carosus strikes the Moor Ielidassen with his sword.

== Etymology ==
We don't know in antiquity another example of this anthroponym, which could mean in Berber "their king"; on the other hand, it is found in the writings of Arabic authors of the Middle Ages, in the form Gellidasen or Gueldacen. It is still worn today by a Berber tribe from the Middle Atlas: Ait Jellidasen. This is one of the rare cases where the Latin transcription of a Berber name, which was stopped at a time, it is true, very low, has remained virtually unchanged until today. As a personal name, it seems to have fallen completely into disuse.
