= Cross of Justin II =

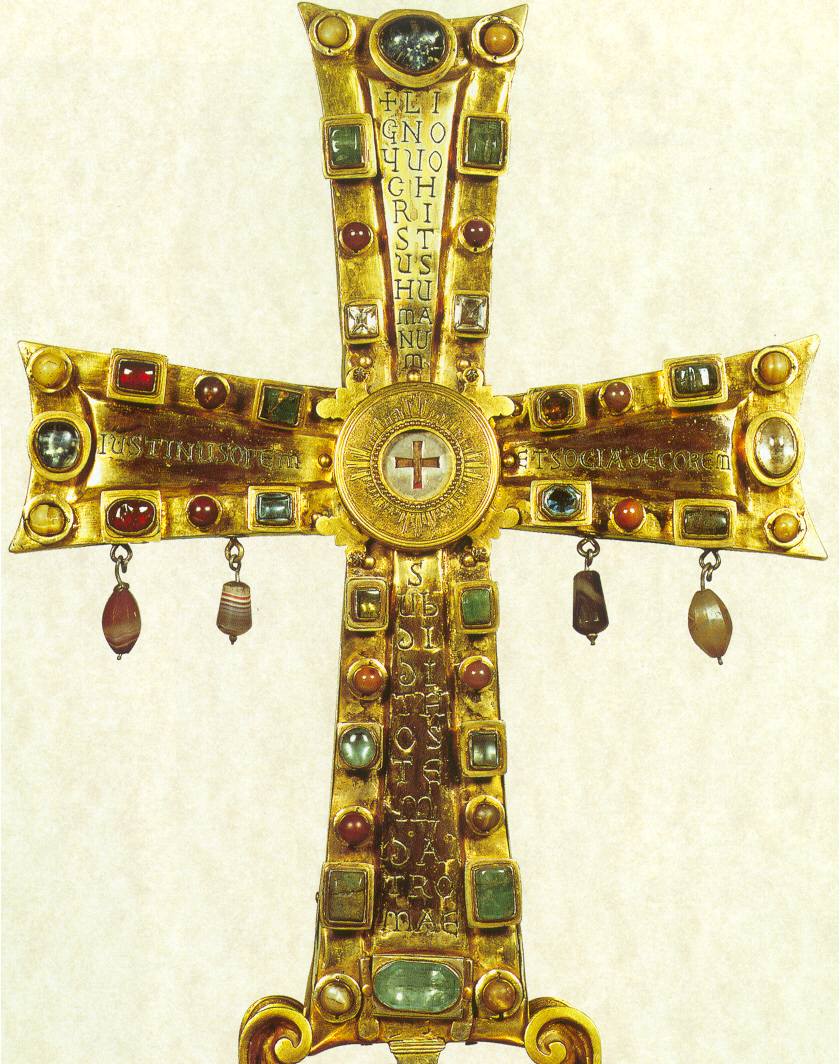
Front side of the Cross of Justin II

The Cross of Justin II (also known as Crux Vaticana, Latin for "Vatican Cross") is a processional cross dating from the sixth century that is kept in the Treasury in St. Peter's Basilica, in Vatican City. It is also one of the oldest surviving claimed reliquaries of the True Cross, if not the oldest. It is a crux gemmata or jewelled cross, silver-gilt and adorned with jewels in gold settings, given to the people of Rome by the Emperor of the Eastern Roman (Byzantine) Empire, Justin II, who reigned from 565 to 578 in Constantinople, and his wife, the Empress Sophia.

The cross bears a Latin inscription reading: ligno quo Christus humanum subdidit hostem dat Romae Iustinus opem et socia decorem which is commonly mistranslated as "For the wood [of the cross] with which human Christ was overcome by the enemy, Justin [and his consort?] give Rome this wealth and decoration" A more accurate reading is: "With the wood with which Christ conquered man's enemy, Justin gives his help to Rome and his wife offers the ornamentation." To mark the end of restoration and conservation work on the cross, it was placed on display in the main Basilica of Saint Peter's from November 2009 to April 12, 2010.

== Description ==
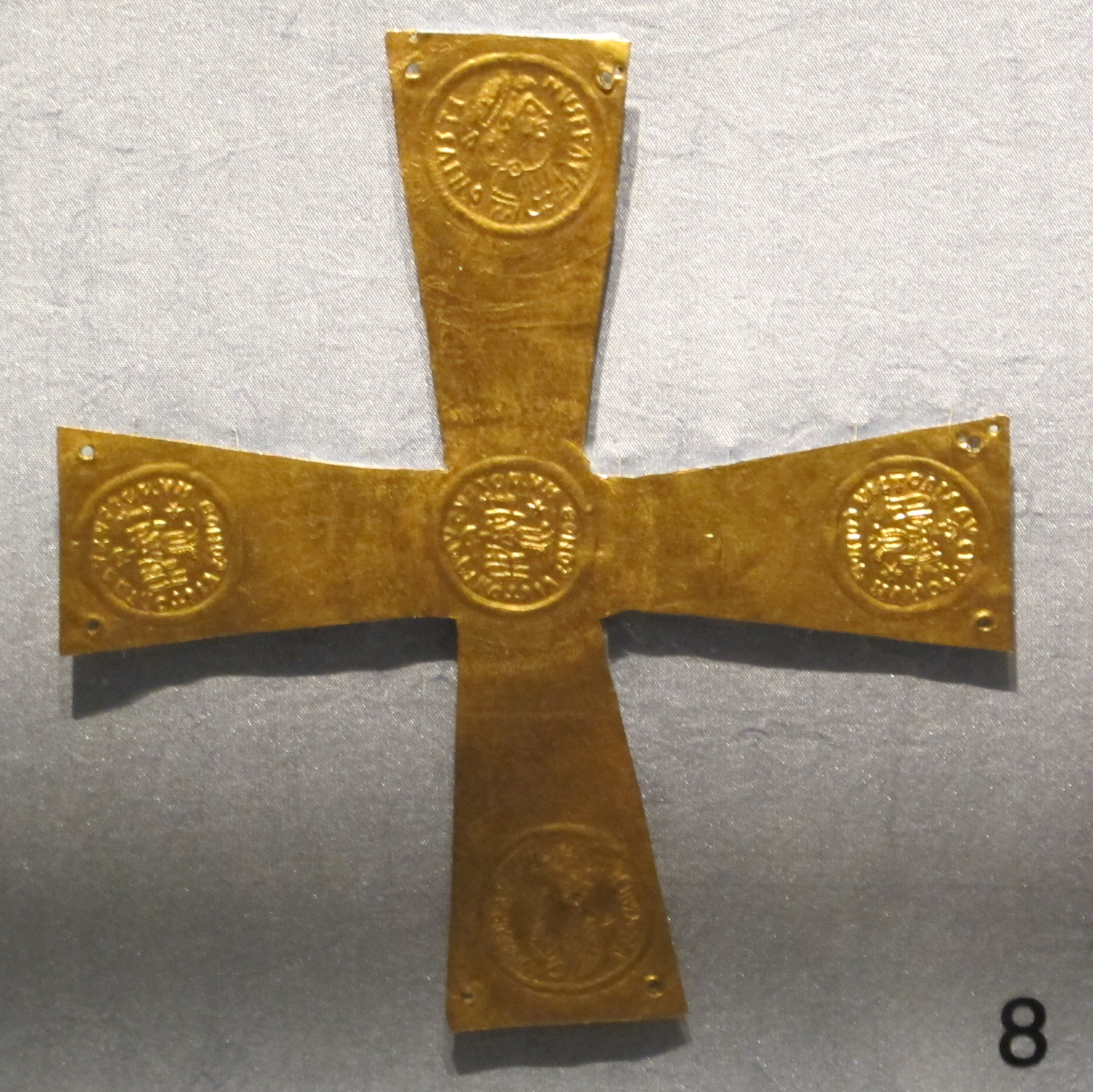
A different, and far humbler, small cross of gold foil, with rubbings of coins of Justin II and holes for nails or thread, Italian, 6th century

The original portion of the cross, which is now mounted on a much later stand, is 15.75 inches high and 11.81 inches wide, excluding the spike at the bottom for fitting into its stand. The cross was restored in 2009; it has been altered and restored at several points in its history, including reducing its size.

The front of the cross has no figurative images: in the centre is a medallion containing the relic, which is itself displayed as cross-shaped. The centres of the arms carry the inscriptions, and the edges of the arms jewels in set in gold, with four jewels hanging from the arms as pendilia. The reverse side is decorated in repoussé silver, and shows an interesting transitional stage in the decoration of the cross. At the period the church was starting to encourage representation of the human figure of Christ on the cross, making a crucifix, which had previously not been usual. The central medallion shows the Lamb of God, a common older formula. Above and below this are images in medallions of Christ (the lower one may be John the Baptist instead). The upper one shows Christ holding a book, representing the Gospels, which was to become a standard feature of the image of Christ Pantocrator; in the lower one Christ or John has a blessing gesture. At the ends of the arms, where the Virgin Mary and Saint John the Evangelist would often be found in later crucifixes, are instead portraits in medallions of Justin and his empress Sophia. Between the medallions there are decorative foliage scrolling motifs, on the upright centred on onion-like plants probably intended as palm-trees.

== Date ==
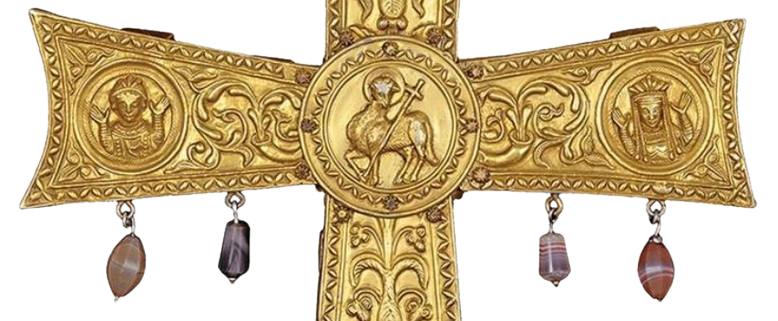
Detail of the cross depicting the Emperor and Empress.

In 569, Justin and Sophia together reportedly sent a relic of the True Cross to the Frankish princess Radegund, who founded a monastery at Poitiers to house it. The event was commemorated in Vexilla Regis by Venantius Fortunatus. They are also recorded as sending relics to Pope John III (reigned 561–574) in an attempt to improve relations – the Crux Vaticana very likely dates from John's reign, perhaps around 568 or 569. Older scholars thought, mainly on the basis of imperial head-dress, that Justin I (r. 518–27) and his empress Euphemia were the donors, but this view seems now rejected.
