= Marcellus (brother of Justin II) =

Marcellus (Greek: Μάρκελλος) was a brother of Byzantine emperor Justin II (r. 565–578) and general under his uncle, Emperor Justinian I (r. 527–565).

== Biography ==
Marcellus was the son of Vigilantia, the sister of Justinian, and Dulcidio (or Dulcissimus), and thus the brother of Justin II and Praejecta. He was married to Juliana, the daughter of Flavius Anastasius Paulus Probus Moschianus Probus Magnus, consul of 518 and a relative of the Emperor Anastasius I (r. 491–518). Juliana was a staunch Monophysite, and despite her family relation to Justin II, during his reign she was persecuted for her faith, being confined to a monastery in Chalcedon and made to perform the most menial tasks until she agreed to communicate, thereby (at least outwardly) renouncing her faith.

In 544, Marcellus was appointed a general, along with Constantinianus, in the ongoing Lazic War (541–562) against Sassanid Persia, replacing the killed generals Justus (a cousin of Justinian and thus Marcellus's uncle) and Peranius. According to Procopius, at this time Marcellus was still very young, "just arriving at the age of manhood". No activities of his are recorded there, however, and the war soon ended by a truce.

Marcellus reappears in 562, when a large horde of Bulgars invaded the Balkans and raided Thrace as far as the neighbourhood of Constantinople, and Emperor Justinian appointed Marcellus to lead an army against them. He is mentioned again (as a patricius) in late 565, when he played an important role, alongside Baduarius, in the ceremonies marking the accession of Emperor Justin II.

The date of his death is unknown; in circa 582/583, his property was divided by the new Byzantine emperor Maurice (r. 582–602) among the latter's father Paul and his brother Peter.

== Sources ==
- Greatrex, Geoffrey; Lieu, Samuel N. C. (2002). The Roman Eastern Frontier and the Persian Wars (Part II, 363–630 AD). London, United Kingdom: Routledge. ISBN 0-415-14687-9.
- Martindale, John R., ed. (1992). The Prosopography of the Later Roman Empire: Volume III, AD 527–641. Cambridge: Cambridge University Press. ISBN 0-521-20160-8.
