= Comito =

Byzantine stage performer

Comito (Greek: Κομιτώ died after 528 AD) was a Byzantine stage performer, the daughter of Acacius "the bear-keeper", and an elder sister to Theodora and Anastasia. Through Theodora, Comito was a sister-in-law of Justinian I. The main source of information on Comito's life is Procopius, although Comito is also mentioned by John Malalas, Theophanes the Confessor and Georgios Kedrenos.

== Life ==
Comito's father, Acacius, was a bear trainer of the hippodrome's Green faction in Constantinople. Her mother, whose name is not recorded, was a dancer and actress. Acacius died when Comito and her sisters were young, and their mother swiftly remarried in the hopes that the post of animal trainer, which often passed from father to son, would be given to her new husband. However, because Acacius left no son and the second husband of his widow had a weaker claim to the position, the bear-trainer post was given to another man. Comito's mother took her daughters to the hippodrome and presented them to the crowd as supplicants, but the Greens rejected them and they were instead taken in by the Blues.

"When this woman saw the populace assembled in the amphitheater, she placed laurel wreaths on her daughters' heads and in their hands, and sent them out to sit on the ground in the attitude of suppliants. The Greens eyed this mute appeal with indifference; but the Blues were moved to bestow on the children an equal office, since their own animal-keeper had just died. When these children reached the age of girlhood, their mother put them on the local stage, for they were fair to look upon; she sent them forth, however, not all at the same time, but as each one seemed to her to have reached a suitable age. Comito, indeed, had already become one of the leading hetaerae [high class prostitutes] of the day."

Evans notes that Theodora would later favor the Blues as an empress, which could point to them having earned her loyalty through saving her family from the threat of unemployment and poverty.

Once she was determined to be old enough, Comito became a hetaera. According to Procopius, when Theodora was a child, she acted as an assistant to Comito, carrying the bench on which Comito sat during public gatherings.

=== Marriage ===
John Malalas records that Comito married the general Sittas in 528. The marriage is also recorded by Theophanes and Cedrenus. Sittas and Comito may be the parents of Sophia, who would marry Justin II and succeed Theodora as empress of Eastern Rome. Sophia is recorded as a niece to Theodora, and it is unclear whether she was the daughter of Comito or Anastasia. Whether Anastasia ever married is unknown.
