= Vigilantia =

Sister of Byzantine emperor Justinian I

Vigilantia (Greek: Βιγιλαντία, c. 490 – after 565) was a sister of Byzantine emperor Justinian I (r. 527–565), and mother to his successor Justin II (r. 565–574).

== Name ==
The name "Vigilantia" is Latin for "alertness, wakefulness". Itself deriving from "vigilia" (watch, watchfulness) and "vigil" ((1)adjective: awake, watching, alert (2)noun: watchman, sentinel).

== Family ==
Justinian (born 482) and Vigilantia were children of Vigilantia (born c. 455), a sister of Justin I (r. 518–527), founder of the Justinian dynasty. The family originated in Bederiana, near Naissus (modern Niš in Serbia) in Dacia Mediterranea. Procopius, Theodorus Lector, Zacharias Rhetor, Victor of Tunnuna, Theophanes the Confessor and Georgios Kedrenos consider Justin and his family Illyrians, though Kedrenos is uncertain. Evagrius Scholasticus, John Malalas, the Chronicon Paschale, the Suda, Joannes Zonaras and the Patria of Constantinople consider them Thraco-Romans. While Procopius reports them to be of peasant origins, Zonaras is the only source describing Justin I as a former herder.

Justinian was reportedly born in Tauresium, near Scupi, where their parents had apparently settled. Their father was named Sabbatius, while the name of their mother is not actually recorded. The name "Bigleniza" was assigned to the mother of Justinian and Vigilantia by Niccolò Alamanni (1583–1626), citing as his source a "Life of Justinian" (Latin: Vita Iustiniani) by "Theophilus Abbas", a supposed contemporary of Procopius. Despite repeated searches, this source has never been located by another scholar. Alamanni was trusted as a reliable source by several later authors, including Edward Gibbon, who in his The History of the Decline and Fall of the Roman Empire quotes the name Bigleniza and other details deriving from Alamanni. Since the name seemed to be Slavic in origin, later theories would develop on the Slavic origins of Justinian and his family. In 1883, James Bryce discovered a "Vita Justiniani" manuscript in the Palazzo Barberini. It only dated to the 17th century and contained all the facts mentioned by Alamanni, including Bigleniza considering her daughter-in-law Theodora, "not a gift of God but a gift of the devil." Bryce suggested this manuscript as Alamanni's source. Its authenticity however was doubtful, and Konstantin Josef Jireček considered this manuscript to be the work of Ivan Tomko Marnavich (1579–1639), archdeacon of Agram (Zagreb). Any other sources he used, if any, are unclear. Marnavich was a translator of medieval texts, particularly hagiographies. Bigleniza is merely a translation of Vigilantia to Slavic, following the long-standing theory that mother and daughter had the same name.

Whilst Vigilantia's relation to Justinian is mentioned by numerous historians, only Victor of Tunnuna names her husband and father of Justin II, Dulcidius (his name is also rendered as Dulcissimus or Dulcidio).

== Succession of Justinian ==
Vigilantia is one of the figures featured in In laudem Justini minoris ("In praise of the younger Justin"), a poem by Flavius Cresconius Corippus written on the occasion of the accession of Justin II. It is more a eulogy than an actual chronicle. Both Vigilantia and her daughter-in-law Sophia, are called "divae", Latin for "divine ones, goddesses", and sources of the poet's inspiration, standing in for the Muses in that respect. Sophia, a niece of Theodora. is likely to have been his patroness and may have commissioned the poem. The Byzantinist Lynda Garland suggests that both Sophia and Vigilantia were Corippus' actual sources on various events, including "behind the scenes" activities. Vigilantia is known to have been alive when her son ascended the throne in 565.

== Marriage and children ==
Vigilantia and Dulcidius/Dulcissimus were parents of three known children:

- Justin II, Byzantine emperor. Married Sophia.
- Marcellus.
- Praejecta.

== Sources ==
- Evans, James Allan Stewart (2000), The age of Justinian: the circumstances of imperial power, Routledge, ISBN 0-415-23726-2
- Fine, John Van Antwerp (2006), When ethnicity did not matter in the Balkans: a study of identity in pre-nationalist Croatia, Dalmatia, and Slavonia in the medieval and early-modern periods, University of Michigan Press, ISBN 0-472-11414-X
- Garland, Lynda (1999), Byzantine empresses: women and power in Byzantium, AD 527-1204, CRC Press, ISBN 0-203-02481-8
- Martindale, John R., ed. (1980). The Prosopography of the Later Roman Empire: Volume II, AD 395–527. Cambridge: Cambridge University Press. ISBN 0-521-20159-4.
- Martindale, John R., ed. (1992). The Prosopography of the Later Roman Empire: Volume III, AD 527–641. Cambridge: Cambridge University Press. ISBN 0-521-20160-8.
