= Cross of Desiderius =

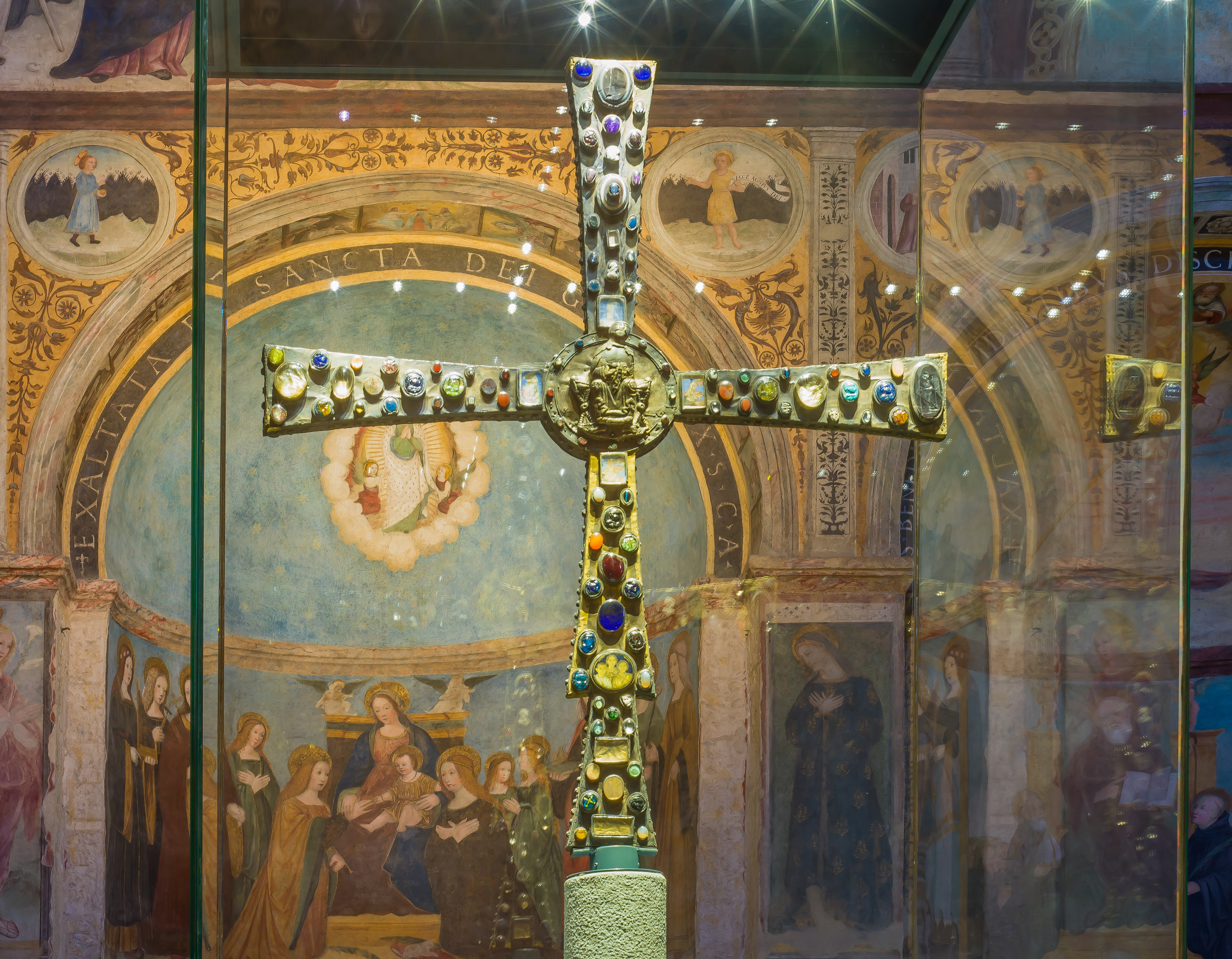
The Cross

The Cross of Desiderius is a wooden gold-plated processional cross. It is named after Desiderius, who is traditionally held to have given it to San Salvatore and Santa Giulia monastery in Brescia, which he and his wife Ansa had founded between 753 and 760. It is a crux gemmata covered with 211 gemstones, including around 50 ancient gems.
