= Paul (father of Maurice) =

Father of Byzantine emperor Maurice

Paul (Latin: Paulus; Greek: Παύλος, romanized: Pav́los), 510-593) was the father of Maurice, Byzantine Emperor. He served as head of the Byzantine Senate.

== Background ==
According to Evagrius Scholasticus, Maurice and his family could trace their lineage from "elder Rome". The future Emperor had been born in Arabissus, Cappadocia. The family's hometown was in the vicinity of modern Elbistan. The town was relatively insignificant for centuries. Justinian I had increased its importance, turning it to a recruiting centre and staging area for his forces. It was part of a military route starting from Caesarea Mazaca (modern Kayseri) and proceeding to Comana and Melitene.

== Career ==
The primary source about Paul is the "Ecclesiastical History" of John of Ephesus. It reports: "At the beginning of his reign, the king sent for his father, an old man named Paul, and his mother, and his brother, whose name was Peter, and his two sisters, one of whom was a widow, and the other the wife of Philippicus. ... And next he made his father head of the senate, and chief of all the patricians, and gave him and his son Peter, the king's brother, the entire property of the great patrician Marcellus, brother of the late king Justin, which was not much less than the royal demesnes themselves, with his houses and landed estates, and gold and silver, and his wardrobe, and every thing that he had everywhere without exception.". And next he gave his father and mother another house near the church (of S. Sophia) and his own palace. John continues to detail the honours bestowed by Maurice to his extended family, placing special focus on Domitian, Bishop of Melitene. While mentioning Domitian as a kinsman of Maurice, John does not specify the exact relation of the Bishop to Maurice or to Paul. Theophanes the Confessor records the death of Paul in 593.

In "Late antiquity: empire and successors, A.D. 425-600", Averil Cameron, Bryan Ward-Perkins, and Michael Whitby observe that Maurice's nepotism in such appointments was probably unpopular with his contemporaries. He had just succeeded Tiberius II Constantine, whose generosity had exhausted the Byzantine treasury. In contrast, Maurice promoted policies intended to "amass and store away" money for the state by decreasing government spending. The Byzantine army experienced decreases in payment and reduced funding, provoking several mutinies by various forces. Maurice soon gained a reputation for avarice and was even rumored to sell public grain for gold. By 602, the population was openly accusing Maurice of orchestrating an ongoing famine. In such a context, Maurice's obvious generosity to his own family was turning public opinion against him. John of Nikiû reports "Now Maurice, who became emperor in succession to the God-loving Tiberius was very avaricious,... [he] welcomed many false, turbulent persons owing to his greed for money. And he sold all the grain of Egypt and converted into gold, and likewise the grain for Byzantium (Constantinople) he sold for gold." Theophylact Simocatta and Theophanes the Confessor report on the mob of Constantinople accusing Maurice of being a Marcianist. The reference being to a Christian sect which rejected almsgiving and apparently charity in general.

The practice of bestowing titles and property to imperial relatives was rather commonplace by this point. Appointments to high-offices were also to be expected. It was part of the process of establishing a new dynasty. Justin II was only the latest emperor to have done so. Maurice, though, suffered in comparison to his immediate predecessor, Tiberius II Constantine, who had not spent lavishly to promote an extended clan to power. Though in this respect, Tiberius looked better by default. Primary sources do not mention him actually having many relatives.

== Family ==
Paul seems to have married twice, though the names of his wives are unknown. John of Ephesus mentions him still married to Maurice's mother c. 582. Theophanes mentions Maurice celebrating the marriage of his father at a later point, presumably the second marriage. Paul had at least four known children

- Maurice, Byzantine Emperor.
- Peter.
- Gordia, wife of Philippicus. She reportedly constructed a monastery dedicated to Mammes of Caesarea. The report originates in the Patria of Constantinople and may be somewhat inaccurate. The Prosopography of the Later Roman Empire considers it likelier that Gordia enlarged an older monastery of Saint Mammes, built by Pharasmanes.
- Theoctista. Widowed prior to the elevation of Maurice to the throne in 582. A letter addressed to her, written by Pope Gregory I, survives.

=== Damiana ===
Charles du Fresne, sieur du Cange (1610–1688) identified another sister of Maurice, mentioned in the Leimon of Joannes Moschus. She was Damiana, mother of Athenogenes, the bishop of Petra in Arabia. She plays a significant part in various chapters.

The information on her family is included in the following lines: "Amma (abbatissa) Damiana, a solitary, the mother of Athenogenus [Athenogenes], the bishop of Petra". ... "Here is another story amma Damiana told us: One Good Friday, before I was enclosed (as an anchoress), I went to (the church of) Saints Cosmas and Damian and spent the whole night there. Late during the night an old woman from Phrygian Galatia came in and gave everyone in the church two small coins (minuta). This was at the time when a niece of mine, and of the most faithful Emperor Mauritius [Maurice], had come to pray in the holy city and had stayed there for the whole year, and I had taken her with me to Saints Cosmas and Damian, so that we were in church together." The passage identifies Damiana having a niece in common with Maurice. Making it likely they were siblings.

"He told us that he had heard the following story being told by Athenogenus [Athenogenes], the bishop of Petra, the son of amma Damiana:My aunt (avia mea) Joanna had a brother called Adelphius, bishop of Arabessus." Avia in Latin literally means grandmother, the mother of someone's parent, not aunt. She herself was abbess of a monastery of women. This bishop went out one day to visit his sister in her monastery. As he went in to the courtyard (atrium) of the monastery he saw a sister possessed of a demon lying on the pavement. The bishop called out to his sister: "Doesn't it worry you that this sister is being troubled and besmirched like this? You surely must know that as abbess you have authority over all your sisters?" "What can I do against a demon?" she replied "What do you think you have been doing all these years?" replied the bishop, who then made a prayer and cleansed that sister of the demon. Since this Joanna was the grandmother of Athenogenes, du Cange identified her as the likely wife of Paul, mother of Damiana, Maurice and their siblings. There is some doubt on how old Joanna and Adelphius were supposed to be. Another tale by Moschus reports them having met John Chrysostom (c. 347 - 407) in person, during a brief stay of his in Cucusus (modern Göksun).

=== Possible descendants ===
The Prosopography notes that there is a 597 reference by Pope Gregory I of another Gordia in Constantinople, identified as wife of Marinus, mother of Theoctista and mother-in-law of Christodorus. The names "Gordia" and "Theoctista" common in the women of the two families might indicate a relation, though the Prosopography merely speculates on it. The Pope seems to have held this lady in some regard, calling her "excellentissima filia mea domna Gordia" (my excellent daughter mistress Gordia). He also points, this Gordia was among the few in Constantinople able to read his Latin texts with no need of a translation to Greek. A number of modern genealogies have speculated this Gordia could be a daughter of the widowed Theoctista, thus a granddaughter to Paul. The younger Theoctista could so be named after her maternal grandmother. Further speculation has the younger Theoctista and Christodorus as ancestors of Domnika, the wife of Bardanes Tourkos and mother of Thekla, a 9th-century Empress.

Little is actually known about this Domnika and less about her ancestry. "Byzantine women: varieties of experience 800-1200" (2006) has a passage about her, written by Judith Herrin. The primary source about her is Theophanes Continuatus. Domnica was a wealthy lady of Constantinople. In 803, Bardanes led a failed revolt against Nikephoros I Logothetes. He was allowed to live and enter a monastery. While part of their family property was confiscated, Domnica was allowed to maintain at least enough to found a new monastery and retire there. An unmarried daughter and several stepdaughters followed her unto monastic life. Her subsequent fate and that of her monastery is unknown. Her story was part of a pattern developing through the period of Byzantine Iconoclasm. "Women of the political elite" were often at risk of falling out of favour along with their relatives, ending up relegated to a monastery. As a security measure, many of them founded monastic communities which were to serve as their "private retirement homes" in time of need. Their enemies could then remove them from the political scene without actually killing them. It is unclear how many of these monasteries survived the death of their respective founder or her immediate relatives.

== Sources ==
- Cameron, Averil.; Ward-Perkins, Bryan; Whitby, Michael (2000), Late antiquity: empire and successors, A.D. 425-600, Cambridge University Press, ISBN 0-521-32591-9
- Garland, Lynda (2006), Byzantine women: varieties of experience 800-1200, Ashgate Publishing, ISBN 0-7546-5737-X
- Martindale, John R., ed. (1992). The Prosopography of the Later Roman Empire: Volume III, AD 527–641. Cambridge: Cambridge University Press. ISBN 0-521-20160-8.
- Whitby, Michael. (1988), The Emperor Maurice and his historian: Theophylact Simocatta on Persian and Balkan warfare, Oxford University Press, ISBN 0-19-822945-3
