= Justus (son of Justin II) =

- Born: Unknown
- Died: Before 565
- Dynasty: Justinian Dynasty
- Father: Justin II
- Mother: Sophia
- Religion: Eastern Orthodox Church

Justus (fl. before 565) was the only recorded son of Roman Emperor Justin II (r. 565–578) and Empress Sophia. Justus most likely died before his father's accession to the throne on 14 November 565.
