= Sophia (empress) =

Byzantine empress (c. 530 – c./aft. 601)

- Augusta
- Sophia as depicted on a bronze half follis (or 20 nummi) coin (struck in 574/5–577/8 AD)

Empress consort of the Eastern Roman Empire
- Tenure: 565–578
- Born: c. 530
- Died: c. 601 (aged approx. 71); Constantinople (now Istanbul, Turkey)
- Spouse: Justin II
- Issue: Justus; Arabia
Names
- Aelia Sophia
Regnal name
- Aelia Sophia Augusta
- Dynasty: Justinian Dynasty
- Father: Sittas (historical theory)
- Mother: Comito (historical theory)

Aelia Sophia (Greek: Σοφία) (c. 530 – c./aft. 601) was Eastern Roman empress as the wife of Emperor Justin II. Sophia participated in the governance of the empire; she took an interest in the financial and foreign policies, and served as regent alongside Tiberius II during Justin's incapacity from 573 until 578.

== Early life ==
According to the Ecclesiastical History of John of Ephesus and the Chronicle of Victor of Tunnuna, Sophia was a niece of Theodora, the Empress consort of Justinian I. John of Ephesus did not specify the identities of her parents. According to the Secret History of Procopius, Theodora had only two siblings: her older sister Comito and younger sister Anastasia; either one could be the mother of Sophia. Procopius identifies Comito as a leading hetaera of her age. John Malalas records that Comito (b. ca 500) married general Sittas in 528. Sittas may thus be the father of Sophia. Whether Anastasia ever married is unknown.

During the reign of Justinian I (527–565), Theodora may have arranged for Sophia to marry the emperor's nephew Justin. According to the Chronicon of Victor of Tunnuna, Justin was a son of Dulcidius and Vigilantia. The father's name is also given as Dulcissimus in genealogical resources. Vigilantia and her brother, Justinian I, were children of Petrus Sabbatius and a senior Vigilantia, who was a sister of Justin I.

According to John of Ephesus and Michael the Syrian, Sophia and Justin were both initially Monophysites who converted to Chalcedonianism to gain favor with their uncle Justinian.

== Empress ==
=== Accession ===
Justinian I had several nephews but seems to have never appointed an heir. On the night of 13 November 565 – 14 November 565, Justinian I lay on his deathbed. Justin was his kouropalates and thus a viable heir within the Great Palace of Constantinople. He managed to gain the support of the Senate and was proclaimed emperor in the palace before the other members of the Justinian Dynasty were notified. The events were recorded by the court poet Corippus.

In his works, Corippus often translates her Greek name "Sophia" to its Latin equivalent "Sapientia". The meaning of both is "Wisdom", and the poet uses it as both a divine name and title for her. The accession speech of Justin makes specific mention of Sophia co-ruling with her husband, the presumption being that she already exercised political influence. Corippus often mentions her in his records of the event and gives her an equal space in the prayer section of the proceedings. Corippus also includes an elaborate account of the Hagia Sophia, mainly as a compliment to the empress who shared its name. Corippus also records Sophia being in charge of the arrangements for the funeral of Justinian and claims she wove his shroud with scenes depicting the military triumphs of his reign.

Sophia took the name Aelia following the practices of the empresses of the Theodosian dynasty and the Leonid dynasty. The name had not been used by the two preceding empresses of her own dynasty. She was the first empress depicted on coinage with royal insignia equal to the emperor, and this coin type continued up to Phocas and Leontia. They were depicted together in images and statues, while the name of Sophia alone was given to two palaces, a harbor, and a public bath built in her honor.

=== Opposition ===
The main challenge to the new reign was another Justin, cousin to the new emperor. Son of Germanus and his first wife Passara, this namesake cousin had distinguished himself in warfare. According to Evagrius Scholasticus, the Emperor and Sophia initially welcomed their kinsman to Constantinople but before long had him exiled to Alexandria. In 568, the other Justin was murdered in his bed, presumably due to his longstanding rivalry with the emperor Justin for the throne. According to John of Biclaro, the murder was carried out by the supporters of Sophia. Evagrius claims that the head of the deceased was sent to the imperial couple who spitefully kicked it around, a detail likely exaggerated by Evagrius.

In 568, Narses was removed from his position as prefect of Italy. According to Paul the Deacon, Sophia sent a message to the senior general that she had a more suitable position for a eunuch like him, as an overseer of the weaving girls of the gynaikonitis (women's quarters). Narses chose to retire to Naples, instead of returning to Constantinople as Justin had ordered him to do and invited the Lombards to invade. But the evidence for this conflict is deemed unreliable by some historians.

=== Financial policy ===
Sophia was involved in the financial policies of Justin. Having inherited an exhausted treasury, they set about repaying the various debts and loans of Justinian to bankers and money-lenders. According to Theophanes the Confessor, Sophia was in charge of the debt repayments, and this act gained her contemporary praise. The imperial couple tried to reduce expenses and increase treasury reserves. Evagrius, John of Ephesus, Gregory of Tours, and Paul the Deacon mention this while accusing both Justin and Sophia of greed. After the death of Justin, Sophia and emperor Tiberius II Constantine were said to have clashed over financial policies.

=== Religious policy ===
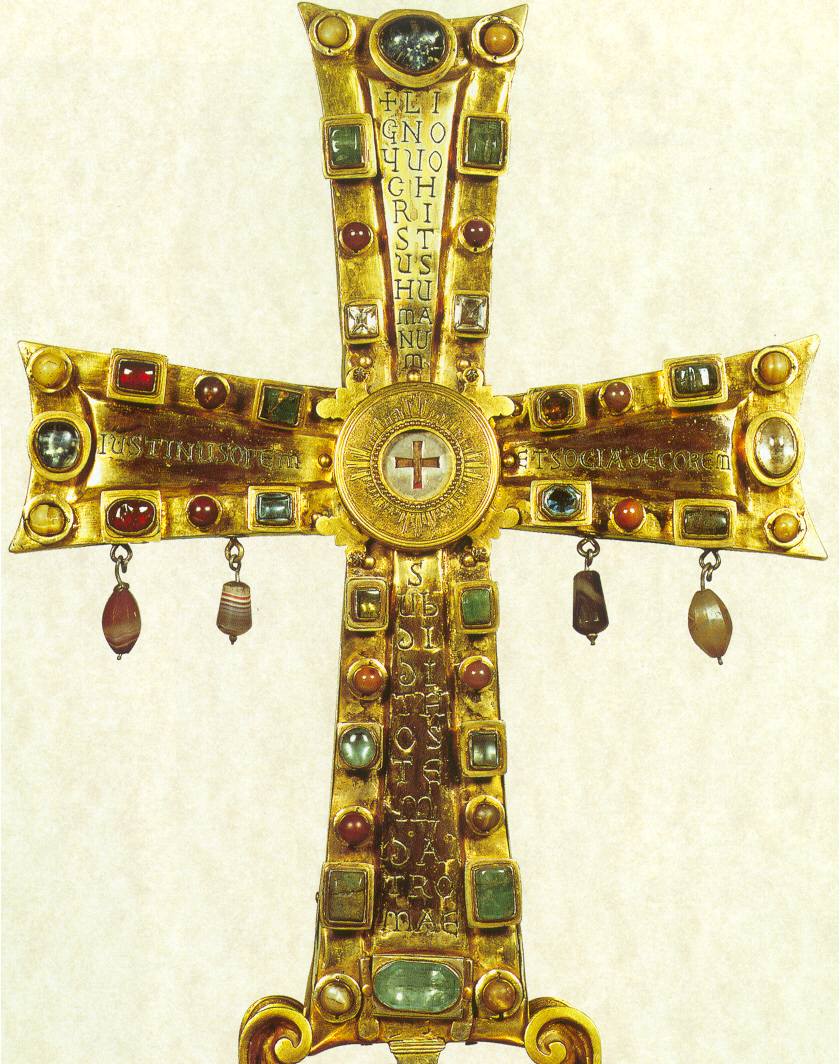
Cross of Justin II

In 569, Justin and Sophia together reportedly sent a relic of the True Cross to Radegund. The event was commemorated in Vexilla Regis by Venantius Fortunatus. They also sent relics to Pope John III in an attempt to improve relations: the Cross of Justin II in the Vatican Museums, a crux gemmata, and a reliquary of the True Cross perhaps given at this point, has an inscription recording their donation and apparently their portraits on the ends of the arms on the reverse. This led to creation of poems by Venantius Fortunatus, which referred to Justin and Sophia as the new Constantine and the new Helena, and indicating Sophia's major role in the presentation of the relic.

For the Monophysites, the religious policy of the couple was controversial. During their reign, they attempted but failed to reconcile Chalcedonian and Monophysitic Christianity, which ended in renewed persecution of the latter. Meanwhile, their own beliefs were still in question. John of Ephesus himself was imprisoned during this persecution, presumably contributing to the hostile tone to Justin and Sophia in his writings.

== Regent (573–578) ==
Justin reportedly suffered from temporary fits of insanity and was unable to perform his duties as early as the fall of Dara to Khosrow I of the Sassanid Empire in November, 573. According to Gregory of Tours, Sophia assumed sole power over the Empire at this point. However, East Roman historians such as Evagrius and Menander state that Tiberius, who was the commander of the Excubitors (comes excubitorum), gained power alongside Sophia. Both Evagrius and Menander report that Sophia concluded a one-year truce with Khosrow on her own, in sharp contrast to her husband's policy against subsidies.

According to John of Ephesus, Sophia attributed the madness of her spouse to his failure to appreciate her status:

"The kingdom came through me, and it has come back to me: and as for him, he is chastised, and has fallen into this trial on my account, because he did not value me sufficiently, and vexed me."

Theophanes records an anecdote that when Justin lashed out at Baduarius during his bouts of madness, Sophia persuaded him to apologize and invite Baduarius to dinner. She had the windows of the palace sealed with bars after he attempted to throw himself out of them.

A year after the emperor's incapacitation, the emperor and senate consulted the empress for the nomination of caesar, and they all agreed on Tiberius as her colleague in power. According to the chronicle of Theophanes, Tiberius was officially appointed caesar by Justin on 7 December 574. He was also adopted by Justin and thus became his appointed heir.

John of Ephesus and Gregory of Tours record that Sophia and Tiberius argued over financial policies: when Tiberius increased government expenses, she criticized him for giving away the government's savings. Justin and Sophia eventually set the ceiling for his expenditure and restricted his access to the treasury.

Both the Ecclesiastical History of John of Ephesus and the Chronicle of Theophanes the Confessor suggest that Sophia was planning to marry Tiberius at this point. Theophanes, writing centuries later, suggests Sophia did not know Tiberius was already married during this period, but this claim is contradicted by John of Ephesus, a 6th-century writer. Tiberius' marriage to Ino Anastasia was apparently seen as an offense to her. Ino and her daughters Constantina and Charito were not allowed to enter the Great Palace of Constantinople. They were instead settled in the palace of Hormisdas, residence of Justinian I prior to his elevation to the throne. According to John of Ephesus, Tiberius joined them every evening and returned to the Great Palace every morning. Sophia also refused to let the ladies at court visit Ino and her daughters as a token of respect to them.

Ino eventually left Constantinople for Daphnudium, her previous residence. According to John of Ephesus, Tiberius left Constantinople to visit Ino when she fell sick. Her daughters are assumed to have joined her in her departure from the capital.

In September 578, Justin II appointed Tiberius as his co-emperor amid deteriorating physical health. On 5 October 578, Justin died and Tiberius became the sole emperor. According to John of Ephesus, Sophia sent Patriarch Eutychius of Constantinople to Tiberius to convince him to divorce Ino, and offered both herself and her adult daughter Arabia as prospective brides. Tiberius refused. Sophia, though still an augusta, no longer had the reins of affairs.

== Later life ==
Sophia retained her rank as augusta and continued to hold a section of the palace for herself. She still had some influence to discuss various matters of government. Meanwhile, Ino Anastasia was also proclaimed augusta. The situation was not to Sophia's liking, and John of Ephesus records further arguments over financial policy. Gregory of Tours records that Sophia took part in a conspiracy to depose Tiberius and replace him with another Justinian, younger brother of the Justin murdered in Alexandria. She hoped to regain her former power as empress consort and a share of the emperor's power.

Tiberius reacted by seizing much of her property, dismissing her loyal servants, and appointing replacements loyal to him. However, her rank and presence in the palace remained. Theophanes records that in 579 Sophia retired to the Sophiai, a palace built in her honor, and says that she held her own minor court and was honored as the mother of Tiberius.

=== Return to the Great Palace ===
On 14 August 582, Tiberius died. However, Sophia remained relevant in Byzantine politics. This is because when he felt himself declining in health, Tiberius is said to have sent for Sophia to ask her advice on who his successor should be. He was succeeded by Maurice, a general betrothed to Constantina. Gregory of Tours reported that Sophia had planned to marry Tiberius to regain the throne, but the marriage of Constantina and Maurice took place in Autumn 582. Constantina was also proclaimed augusta and John of Ephesus mentions that all three augustas resided in the Great Palace, which would mean either that Sophia's retirement was temporary or that Theophanes misreported her status.

=== Final years ===
Anastasia was the first of the three women to die. Theophanes places her death in 593. Constantina seems to have enjoyed better relations with Sophia than her mother did. Theophanes records their having jointly offered a precious crown as an Easter present to Maurice in 601. He accepted their gift, but then ordered it hung over the altar of Hagia Sophia as his own tribute to the church. According to Theophanes, this was taken an insult by both augustas and caused a rift in the marriage.

The Easter of 601 was also the last time that is heard of Sophia. Whether she survived to see the deposition of Maurice in 602 is unclear. According to the Book of Ceremonies, she received an imperial burial at the Church of the Holy Apostles beside her husband.

== Children ==
Sophia and Justin had at least two children:

- Justus. A son, died before 565. Buried in the Church of Michael the Archangel.
- Arabia, a daughter. Married prior to the succession of her father to the kouropalatēs Baduarius. Her husband died c. 576 while defending Byzantine Italy from the Lombards. They had a daughter, Firmina, whose fate is unknown.

== Sources ==
- Cameron, Averil (1975). "The Empress Sophia". Byzantion. 45 (1): 5–21. JSTOR 44170464.
- Garland, Lynda (1999). Byzantine empresses: women and power in Byzantium, AD 527-1204. London: Routledge.
- Martindale, John R., ed. (1992). The Prosopography of the Later Roman Empire: Volume III, AD 527–641. Cambridge: Cambridge University Press. ISBN 0-521-20160-8.

Royal titles
Preceded by Theodora	Byzantine Empress consort 565–578	Succeeded by Ino Anastasia
