= Crux gemmata =

Jewelled cross typical of Early Christian and Early Medieval art

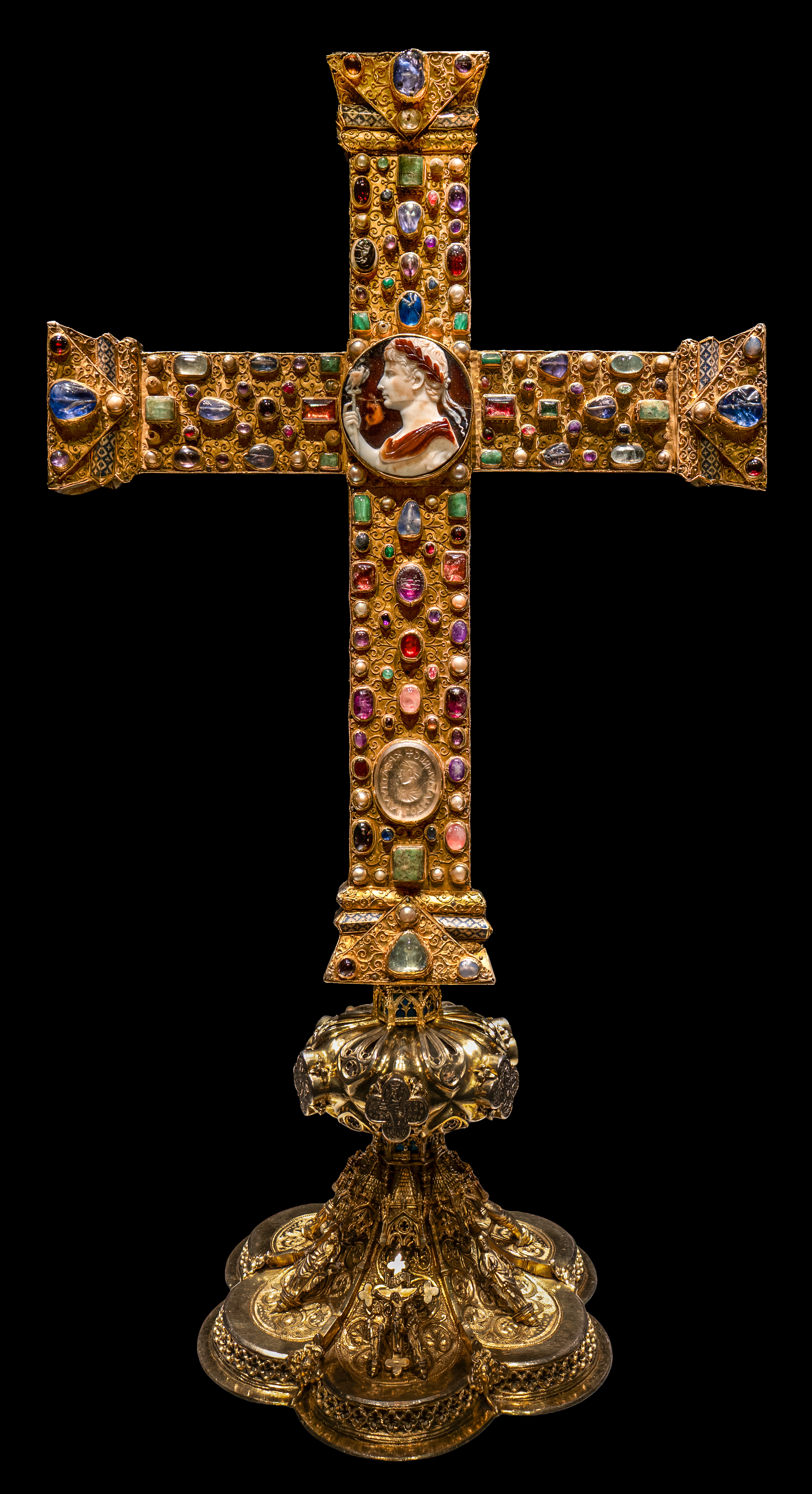
The front side of the Cross of Lothair (c. 1000 AD)

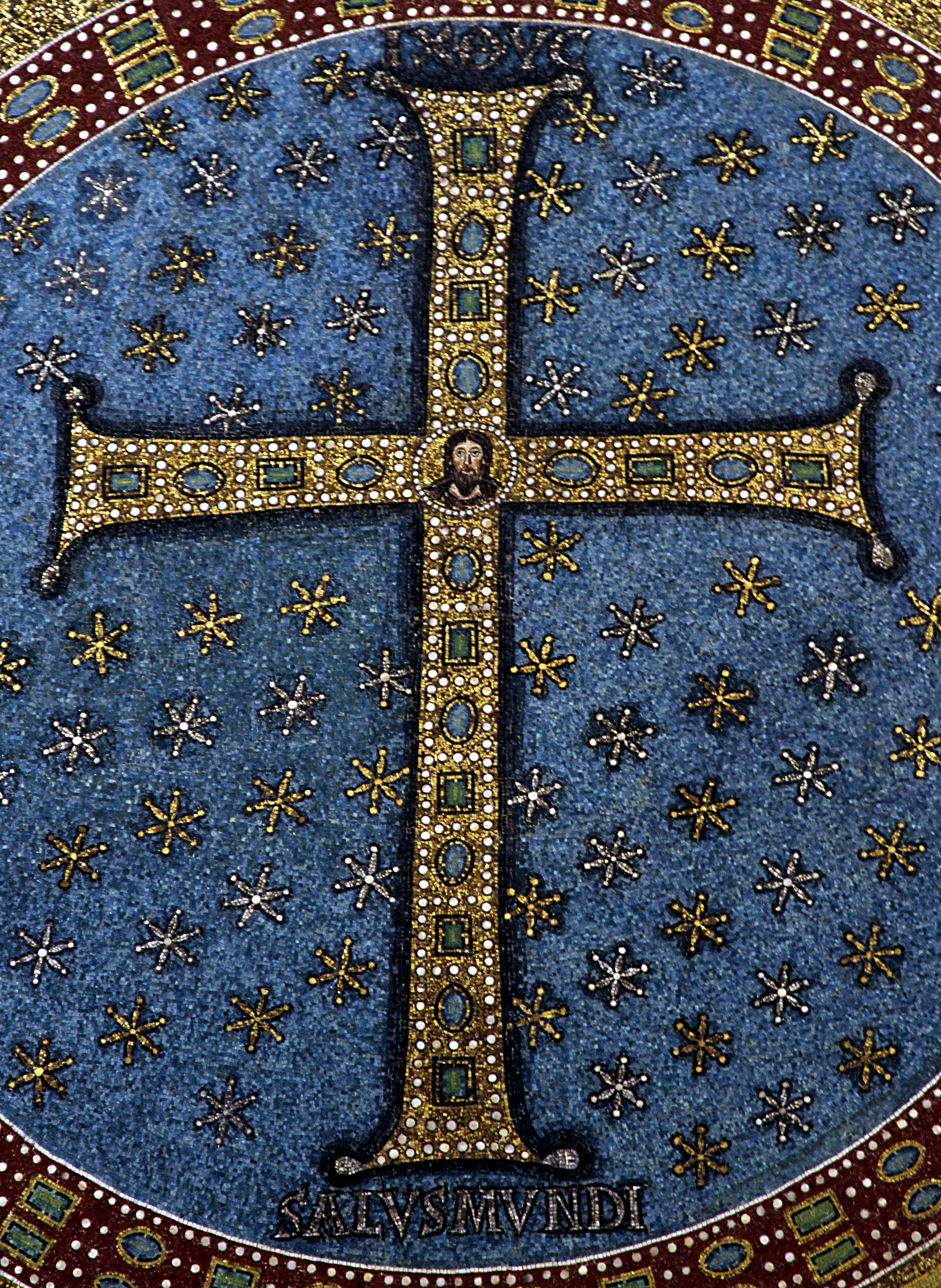
Detail of a mosaic, Basilica of Sant' Apollinare in Classe, Ravenna (549).

A crux gemmata (Latin for jewelled cross) is a form of cross typical of Early Christian and Early Medieval art, where the cross, or at least its front side, is principally decorated with jewels. In an actual cross, rather than a painted image of one, the reverse side often has engraved images of the Crucifixion of Jesus or other subjects.

Examples in metalwork are the Cross of Justin II (6th century, in the Vatican Museums), the 'crumpled cross' in the Staffordshire Hoard (8th century), the Cross of Lothair (10th century, Aachen Cathedral Treasury), the Iberian Cross of the Angels (808) and Victory Cross (908), and the Cross of Cong (1120s?, National Museum of Ireland).

== History of use ==
In the Late Antique and early medieval periods, many objects of great significance, such as reliquaries, were studded with jewels in a style that in recent centuries has been restricted to crowns and other coronation regalia and small pieces of jewellery. In the case of the cross, such decorative embellishment was especially common, and the jewelled cross is a specific type that was represented in paint, mosaic, carved ivory and other media. Jewelled crosses were also carved in stone, e.g. the Shandwick Stone with the jewels represented by bosses.

The cross very often has splayed ends to its arms, but the proportions of the vertical axis to the horizontal one depends entirely on the needs of the composition, and varies greatly. Pendilia, or hanging jewels or ornaments, may hang from the arms, especially the letters alpha and omega shaped in gold. The motif is first seen in a sarcophagus fragment from the late 4th century; the splayed ends of the arms are present from the earliest examples.

In depictions of the cross, such as that in the mosaic in Santa Pudenziana, Rome (384–9), the jewelled cross stands on a hill or mound with a backdrop of a panoramic view representing Jerusalem, with the cross itself representing the New Jerusalem or "heavenly city". The jewelled cross also served as a symbol of the Christian version of the Tree of Life, especially when the arms are shown putting out shoots from their corners. The Staffordshire Hoard 'crumpled cross' has vine leaves showing at the corners and represents Jesus the vine. It is sometimes shown on a mound representing paradise, with four rivers flowing down it (the four rivers were understood as representing the Four Gospels); a stepped base represents the hill in actual crosses or more confined depictions. The link of the cross generally with the Tree of Life appears frequently in the hymns of Venantius Fortunatus. Sharp (2016) has shown the interlace on the front of the Staffordshire Hoard cross corresponds with the river or tree of life described in Revelation 22. 1–2.

The use of large jewelled crosses as processional and military crosses stems from the victory of Constantine over his rival Maxentius at the Battle of the Milvian Bridge outside Rome in 312 AD. The vision of Constantine led to his having a large golden gem-studded processional cross made and the adoption of the cross as a standard by Christian armies.

For much of the period, a large jewelled cross is recorded as decorating the presumed site of the Crucifixion, around which the Church of the Holy Sepulchre had been built. It was presented by the Eastern Emperor Theodosius II (reigned 408–450). The Empress Helena, mother of Constantine in the early 4th century allegedly discovered part of the True Cross, at a time when interest in the cross was increasing, in part due to its use as a standard by the Roman Army under Constantine her son.

The paradox whereby the instrument of execution is rendered the vehicle of Christ's triumph in the Resurrection remains to the present day a central theme in Christian devotion, and the jewelled cross was one of its first visual manifestations.

Although it is clear that the cross was associated with Christians from a very early period, and the sign of the cross was made by Christians, it is rarely seen in the earliest Christian art, such as that in the Catacombs of Rome, where there are only about 20 crosses, though the anchor, which appears more commonly, was a disguised cross symbol. There was resistance to representations of the cross with the body of Christ on it, a practice that did not begin until the 5th century, becoming more common in the 6th.

One of the earliest representations of a Crucifixion scene rather oddly shows the three crosses of the gospel accounts, with the two thieves hanging in place on theirs, but with Christ standing at the foot of his. The fierce Christological disputes of the period saw the Monophysites, who rejected the human nature of Christ, objecting to the depiction of his body on the cross, and this influenced the use of the empty cross, especially in Byzantine-controlled areas such as Ravenna, where several of the Emperors had Monophysite sympathies. It was the Nestorians, another heretical force of the opposite persuasion, who helped to popularize images of Christ on the cross.

In so-called "mystical" images, such as the apse mosaic at the Basilica of Sant' Apollinare in Classe, Ravenna (549), the jewelled cross stands specifically as a symbol for Christ. A poem by St Paulinus of Nola allows a reconstruction of a mosaic apse he had (as bishop) commissioned in the basilica of St Felix of Nola at Cimitile in the early 5th century. The whole Trinity was shown, represented by a Hand of God for God the Father at the top, above a large crux gemmata with stars in a circular frame, so very similar to Sant' Apollinare in Classe, and below that a dove for the Holy Spirit. At the bottom of the semi-dome were twelve lambs, six on each side, with a haloed Lamb of God on a raised hillock in the centre, looking up. The bottom of the mosaic at Santa Pudenziana in Rome originally also had a bottom level with this.

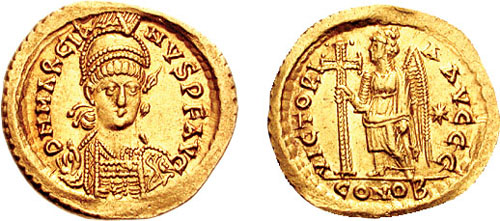
A gold solidus of Marcian, 450–457.

The crux gemmata is commonly seen on coins, often held by a figure of Victory, especially in the Eastern Empire. Another common Byzantine coin type shows a cross with a stepped base, which should be understood as a crux gemmata even though scale does not normally allow any indication of gems.

Contrary to the assertion of Dan Brown in The Da Vinci Code, it is not especially typical for a cross to have thirteen gems, though when one does, it probably does symbolize Jesus Christ and his Twelve Apostles. The apse mosaic in the Basilica of Saint Paul Outside the Walls (c. 1220) has an example with thirteen jewels, but examples from the first millennium generally have more. It is not usual to use the term "crux gemmata" for crosses from more recent periods, especially for small crosses that fall under the category of jewellery.

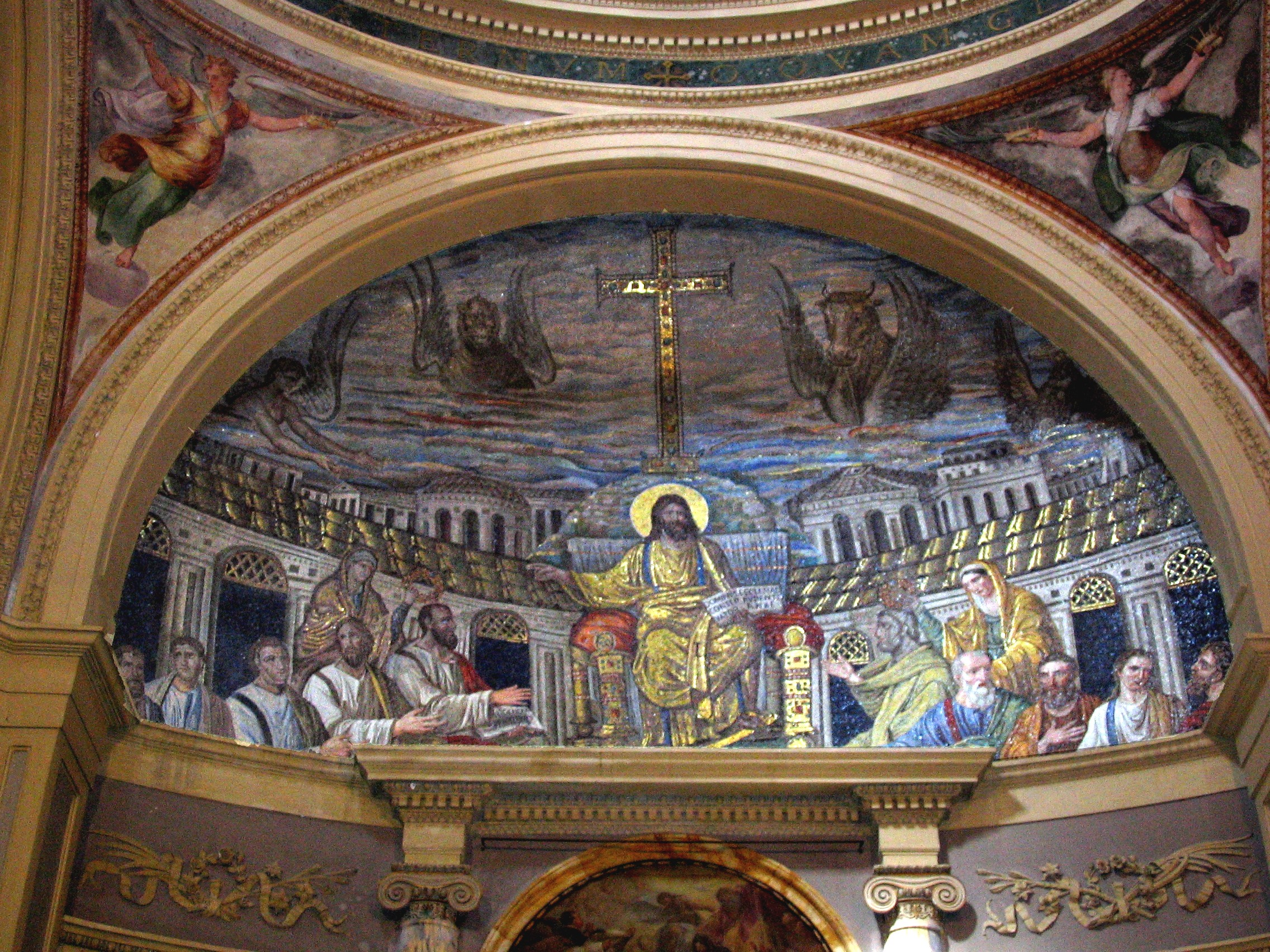
Santa Pudenziana, Rome, apse mosaic, 384-9

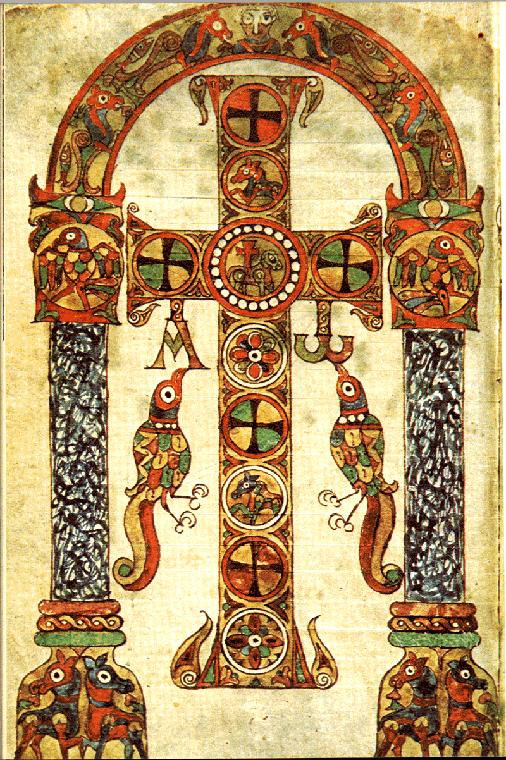
A Crux gemmata from an Insular illuminated manuscript

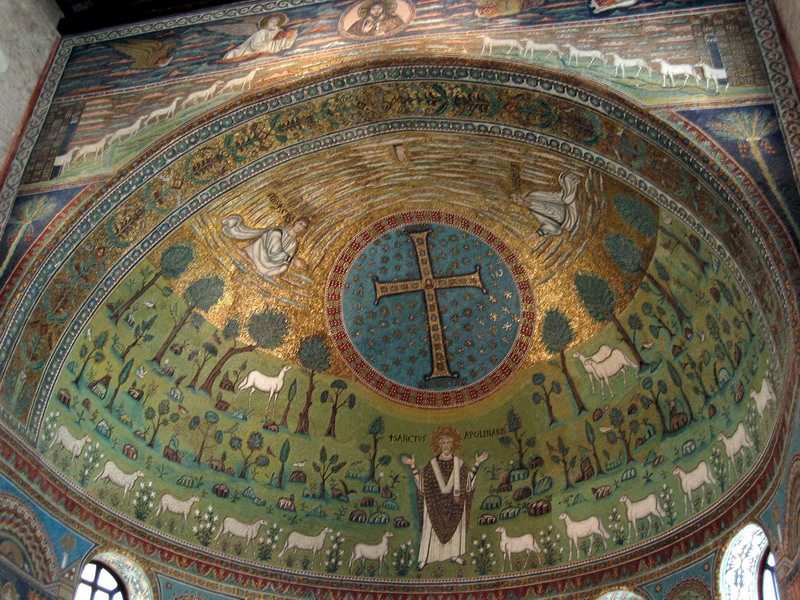
Apse semi-dome in mosaic, Basilica of Sant' Apollinare in Classe, Ravenna (549)

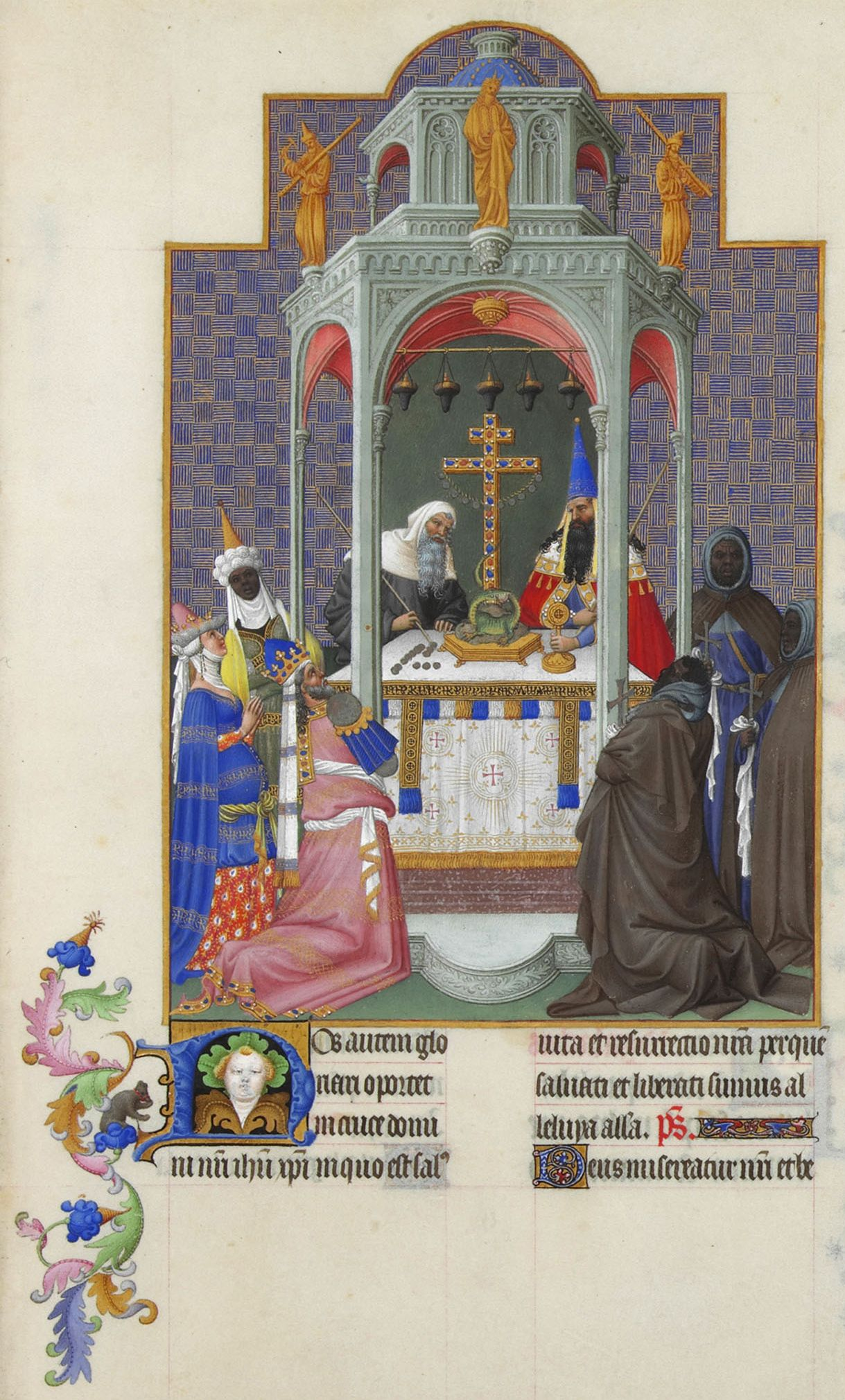
Exaltation of the Cross from the Très Riches Heures du Duc de Berry, c. 1410

Cross of Peñalba

Cross of the Angels

Victory Cross

== Bibliography ==
- Friesen, Ilse E., The Female Crucifix: Images of St. Wilgefortis Since the Middle Ages, Wilfrid Laurier University Press, 2001, ISBN 0-88920-365-2, google books
- Hellemo, Geir. Adventus Domini: eschatological thought in 4th-century apses and catecheses, BRILL, 1989, ISBN 90-04-08836-9, ISBN 978-90-04-08836-8 google books
- Schiller, Gertrud, Iconography of Christian Art, Vol. I, 1971 (English trans from German), Lund Humphries, London, ISBN 0-85331-270-2
- Schiller, Gertrud, Iconography of Christian Art, Vol. II, 1972 (English trans from German), Lund Humphries, London, ISBN 0-85331-324-5
- Eduard Syndicus; Early Christian Art, Burns & Oates, London, 1962
- Wernher, Martin, The Liudhard Medalet, in Anglo-Saxon England, Volume 20, eds. Michael Lapidge, Malcolm Godden, Simon Keynes, Cambridge University Press, 1992, ISBN 978-0-521-41380-0, google books
- Sharp, Robert (2016). The Hoard and Its History: Staffordshire's Secrets Revealed. Brewin Books, ISBN 978-1858585475.
