= Gertrud Schiller =

Gertrud Schiller (7 January 1905 – 4 December 1994) was a German art historian, nurse, social pedagogue and Lutheran teacher of religion. Despite not having a doctorate in art history, she wrote what remains a standard work on Christian iconography. Schiller received an honorary doctorate from the Kirchliche Hochschule Berlin in 1979.

== Life ==
Schiller was born on 7 January 1905 in Beerbach (now part of Lauf an der Pegnitz), the daughter of the pastor and later dean Wilhelm Heinrich Schiller and his wife Elise Anna Margaretha Schiller, née Kübel. She grew up in Beerbach and Augsburg.

From 1915 she attended the Anna Barbara von Stettensches Institut, a Höhere Mädchenschule in Augsburg, which did not allow its students to take the Abitur. This meant that she could not study art history at university. During First World War, she suffered the death of cousins and uncles. In 1923, she attended a household school (Haushaltsschule) in Munich and then learned nursing care at the municipal hospital in Augsburg.

In 1927, Schiller decided to pursue the then new profession of social pedagogue and therefore went to Frankfurt. She chose the topic "Adult Education and Elementary Schools" for her exam to enter. During her training she held a six-month internship at the welfare office (Wohlfahrtsamt) in Marburg, which was also responsible for the youth welfare office (Jugendbehörde) in Hamburg at the time. After her training, she accepted a job at the Protestant Church in Hamburg and moved there in 1928.

In 1930 she became director of the Clemens-Schulz-Heim, a church conference centre in Kuddewörde. Under the Nazi regime, churches rather than schools had to deliver religious instruction. Schiller took a course to qualify as an instructor at the Johannesstift in Spandau. At this time, she became interested in the medieval art on display at the Kaiser-Friedrich-Museum.

In 1944, Schiller gave religious instruction in Franconian Switzerland, but lived in Bamberg. After the war ended, she suggested establishing an office for advising congregations on artistic matters. From 1946 to 1969, Schiller was head of the church art service, an office of the Lutheran Church in Hamburg. She encouraged young theologians and artists at the Kirchliche Hochschule Hamburg. In 1979, was awarded an honorary doctorate from the Kirchliche Hochschule Berlin.

In 1994 she died in Grafrath, and was buried in Augsburg.

== Works ==
=== Iconography of Christian Art ===
Schiller's standard work on Christian iconography, Ikonographie der christlichen Kunst, was published in a total of seven volumes in German, from 1966 to 1991 - it was planned as five volumes, but in the last two the text and illustrations were bound separately. A second edition, slightly revised, was published in German. The first two volumes only have been translated into English, by Janet Seligman, using the revised edition. These were published as Iconography of Christian Art in 1971 and 1972 by Lund Humphries in London and the New York Graphic Society in New York.

- Ikonographie der christlichen Kunst. 5 (7) volumes and register. Mohn, Gütersloh, from 1966. (In English: Iconography of Christian Art 2 vol. Translated by Janet Seligman. Lund Humphries, London, from 1971.)
  - Band 1: Inkarnation, Kindheit, Taufe, Versuchung, Verklärung, Wirken und Wunder Christi. 1966 (third, revised ed. 1981, ISBN 3-579-04135-5) (In English: Christ's Incarnation, Childhood, Baptism, Temptation, Transfiguration, Works and Miracles. 1971)
  - Band 2: Die Passion Jesu Christi. 1968 (2nd, revised ed. 1983, ISBN 3-579-04136-3) (In English: The Passion of Jesus Christ. 1972 ISBN 0-85331-324-5)
  - Band 3: Die Auferstehung und Erhöhung Christi. 1971 ISBN 3-579-04137-1 (2nd, revised ed. 1986)
  - Band 4, 1: Die Kirche. 1976 ISBN 3-579-04138-X (2nd, revised ed. 1988)
  - Band 4, 2: Maria. 1980 ISBN 3-579-04139-8
  - Band 5, 1: Die Apokalypse des Johannes. Text. 1990 ISBN 3-579-00261-9
  - Band 5, 2: Die Apokalypse des Johannes. Images 1991 ISBN 3-579-00262-7
  - Register to volumes 1 – 4,2. By Rupert Schreiner. 1980.

=== Other works ===
In 1938 she published a book in three volumes, titled Images of the Bible (Easter, Christmas, Encounters with Christ) at the Atlantis Verlag, which were published in the second edition by the Johannes Stauda-Verlag in Kassel.

In 1941, two further volumes, The Passion of Christ and Creation were also published there. Following a review by Wilhelm Stählin, the Deutscher Caritasverband requested Schiller to set up an iconographic library. In Freiburg she got in touch with Reinhold Schneider. At the end of the war, she wrote Das Licht scheint in der Finsternis, which was published in 1946 by Johannes-Stauda-Verlag.

- Hamburgs neue Kirchen, 1951–1961. Christians, Hamburg 1961.
- Die Offenbarung des Johannes. Farbige Bilder aus der Bamberger Apokalypse um 1020. Wittig, Hamburg 1955 (Also: (= Frühmittelalterliche Buchmalerei. Vol. 10, ZDB-ID 847783-8). Evangelische Verlags-Anstalt, Berlin 1970)
- Die Boten Gottes. Stauda, Kassel 1951
- Bericht über die Tätigkeit des Kirchlichen Kunstdienstes von 1946–1951. Kirchl. Kunstdienst, Hamburg 1951.
- as ed. Martin Schongauer: Die Passion Christi. Kupferstiche (= Meister der Graphik. Vol. 6 ZDB-ID 251934-3). Introduction by Gertrud Schiller. Wegner, Hamburg 1948.
- Das Licht scheint in der Finsternis. Die Weihnachtsbotschaft verkündet in Wort, Bild und Lied. Stauda, Kassel 1946 (2nd ed. 1950)
- as ed.: Bilder zur Bibel. Das Wort der Heiligen Schrift dargestellt in Meisterwerken der Kunst. In 6 parts. Atlantis-Verlag et al, Berlin et al. from 1938.
  - Part 1: Ostern. Atlantis-Verlag, Berlin et al. 1938
  - Part 2: Begegnungen. Atlantis-Verlag, Berlin et al. 1938
  - Part 3: Weihnachten. Atlantis-Verlag, Berlin et al. 1938
  - Parts 4/5: Das Leiden Christi. Atlantis-Verlag, Berlin et al. 1939
  - Part 6: Schöpfung. Stauda, Kassel 1941
