= Arabia (daughter of Justin II) =

Daughter of Justin II

- Born: Arabia Vibina possibly 545 AD
- Died: after 578 AD (aged approx. 33)
- Burial: Most likely Constantinople, Byzantine Empire (modern-day Istanbul, Turkey)
- Dynasty: Justinian Dynasty
- Father: Justin II
- Mother: Sophia
- Religion: Eastern Orthodox Church

Arabia (Greek: Ἀραβία; fl. 578 AD) was the only recorded daughter of Byzantine Emperor Justin II (r. 565–578 AD) and Empress Sophia.

== Name and meaning ==
While mentioned in several primary sources, her name is only recorded in the Patria of Constantinople. The name is generally accepted as genuine, though Cyril Mango has raised some doubts in his works.

Shahîd's Byzantium and the Arabs in the sixth century (1995) examines the implications of her name. Arabia appears to be a unique personal name, and she seems to have been named by her great-aunt, Empress Theodora, as a show of gratitude to Arab phylarch Arethas. The poem In laudem Justini minoris ("In praise of the younger Justin") by Flavius Cresconius Corippus, a primary source for the coronation of her father, notes its difference from the conventional and respectable name of her mother, indicating that it did sound strange even to a contemporary.

The name would appear to have negative connotations, as the Arab people were mostly seen as barbarians by the Byzantines. Similarly embarrassing names for the women of an imperial family had resulted in renamings both before and after Arabia's lifetime, for instance the empresses Aelia Eudocia and Aelia Anastasia, whose original names (Athenaïs and Ino) had pagan connotations. At the time however, the Byzantine Empire had a subject Arab population in the provinces of the Diocese of the East, a population that had undergone both Hellenization and Christianization. Thus "Arab" did not translate to "enemy" or "raider". For hostile peoples of Arab origin, the sources use the term "Saracens" instead.

Shahîd speculates that the name may have something to do with the period of Arabia's birth. Corippus informs us that Arabia was a married woman when her father rose to the throne in 565. Assuming her to be at least twenty years old, Shahîd suggests that the name could have been chosen to please her great-aunt Theodora (d. 548), the wife of Justinian I (r. 527–565). Theodora was noted for her support of Monophysitism, while her husband was known for actively persecuting this religious faction. One of Theodora's allies and strong supporter of Monophysitism happened to be the Arab phylarch Al-Harith ibn Jabalah (Arethas) of the Ghassanids. Arabia may have been named in honor of this alliance, especially given Justin's and Sophia's own adherence to Monophysitism at the time.

== Life ==
She married Baduarius, with whom she may have had a daughter, Firmina, attested in a single inscription dated to 564. The phrasing of the inscription is obscure, containing a Greek word that could be seen as "γενημένη" or "γενόμενη" of Arabia. "γενημένη" means "born of" and would make the phrase read "Firmina, daughter of Arabia", whilst "γενόμενη" means "who became". Cyril Mango reads the phrase as "Firmina who became the nursemaid of Arabia".

Arabia is recorded by Corippus in his poem praying with her mother on 14 November 565: "At her holy side went her beautiful daughter, who could outdo the full moon with her own light, the equal of her mother in height, as shining in her appearance, as beautiful with her snowy cheeks. Her eyes blaze with fire, like her mother's". She was depicted in a statue at the Milion; another was possibly placed at the harbour of Sophianae.

When her father died in 578 and was succeeded by Tiberius II, Arabia was a widow, and her mother offered to Tiberius to marry herself or her daughter Arabia, however he refused to divorce.

== Religious account ==
A hagiography of Simeon Stylites the Younger claims that Arabia suffered from demonic possession during the reign of her father, and was cured by the saint. Another claim indicates, Saint Timothy of Proconessus is honored for healing the demon-possessed daughter of Emperor Justinian. He died on August 1. In gratitude, Empress Theodora established a monastery at the healing site, where his relics were found and a sacred spring emerged. Located southeast of the island in Topagac, the monastery hosts an annual festival in his honor. Saint Timothy is the island's patron saint.

== Sources ==
- Janin, Raymond (1950), Constantinople Byzantine, Paris: Institut Français d'Etudes Byzantines
- Martindale, John R.; Jones, A.H.M.; Morris, John (1992), The Prosopography of the Later Roman Empire - Volume III, AD 527–641, Cambridge University Press, ISBN 0-521-20160-8
- Shahîd, Irfan (1995). Byzantium and the Arabs in the sixth century, Volume 1. Dumbarton Oaks. ISBN 978-0-88402-214-5.
