= Baduarius =

Baduarius (Latin: Baduarius, Greek: Βαδουάριος) was an East Roman aristocrat, the son-in-law of Byzantine emperor Justin II (r. 565–578 AD). Theophanes the Confessor erroneously calls him a brother of the Emperor.

== Biography ==
Possibly the son or grandson of a similarly named general active in Scythia Minor in 528, Baduarius is recorded by the Latin epic poet Flavius Cresconius Corippus as having succeeded Justin in his post as curopalates immediately after the latter's rise to the Byzantine throne on November 14, 565. At the time, he was already a holder of the rank of patrikios.

In circa 566/567, Baduarius was ordered to raise an army in the lower Danube (Moesia and Scythia Minor) in order to assist the Gepids against the Lombards. The Byzantines won the first battle, but then the Gepid king Cunimund refused to hand back Sirmium as he had promised. Left unaided against the Lombards and Avars, Cunimund was defeated and killed. The post of Baduarius in this campaign is obscure: he may have been a magister militum per Illyricum, a magister militum without an assigned area, or the quaestor exercitus.

A comes stabuli ("count of the imperial stables") in 573, he was sent to Italy soon after to resist the Lombard conquest of the peninsula. The Lombards, however, defeated him in battle in 576, and he died soon after.

=== Family ===
Baduarius had married Justin's daughter Arabia, with whom he may have had a daughter, Firmina, attested in a single inscription dated to 564. The phrasing is obscure: it contains a Greek word that could be seen as "γενημένη" or "γενόμενη" of Arabia. The term "γενημένη" means "born of" and would make the phrase read "Firmina, daughter of Arabia", whilst "γενόμενη" means "who became". Cyril Mango reads the phrase as "Firmina who became the nursemaid of Arabia".
