= Corippus =

6th-century Roman African poet

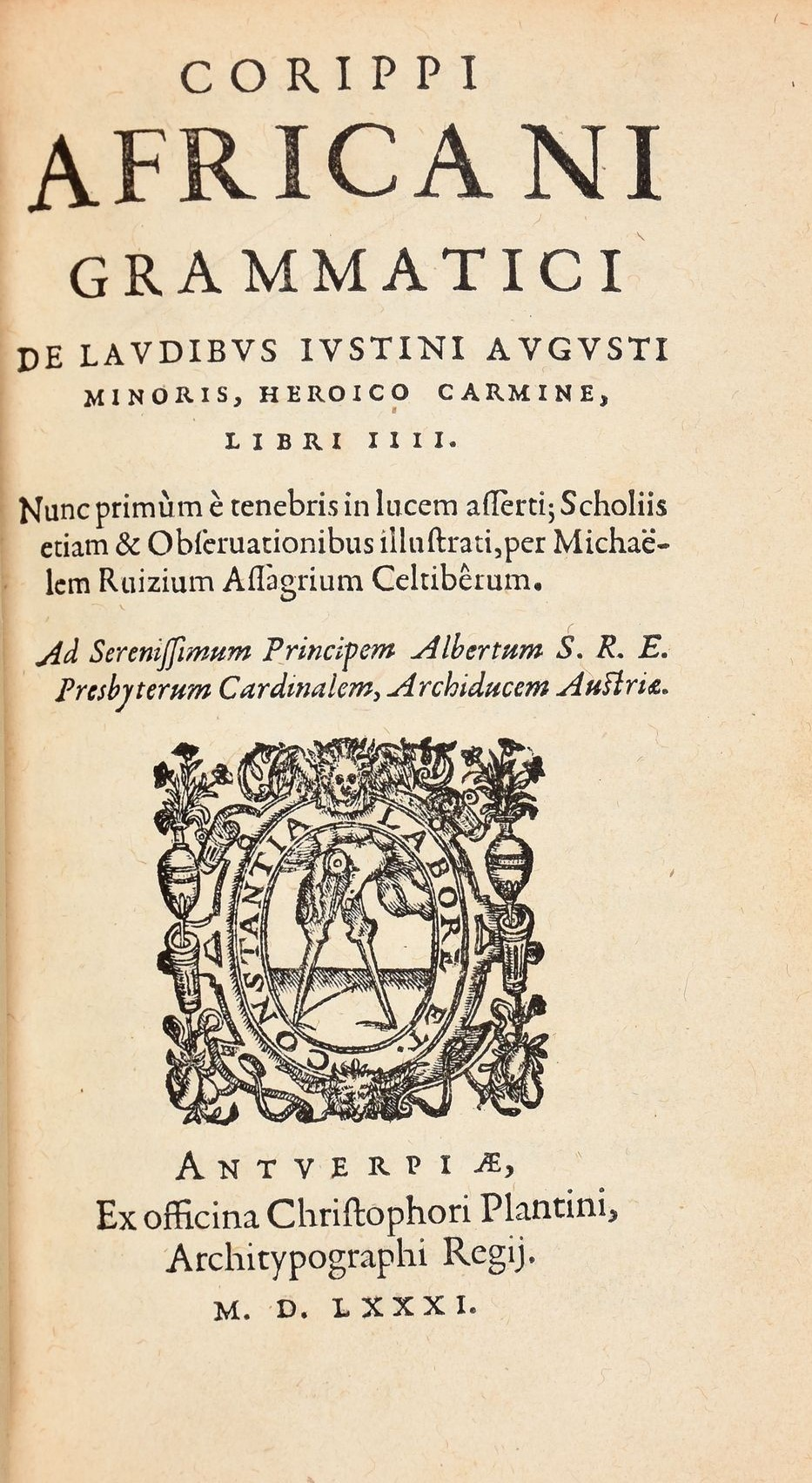
De laudibus Iustini Augusti, published in Antwerp in 1581

Flavius Cresconius Corippus (floruit 565) was a Roman African epic poet who flourished under East Roman emperors Justinian I and Justin II. His major works are the epic poem Iohannis, a panegyric called "Panegyric of Anastasius", and a poem in praise of the Emperor Justin II, In laudem Iustini minoris. Corippus was probably the last important Latin author of Late Antiquity.

== Biography ==
Flavius Cresconius Corippus' name is known on a basis of just one document. He was a native of Africa, and in one of the medieval manuscripts is called africanus grammaticus. He has sometimes been identified, but on insufficient grounds, with Cresconius Africanus, a Catholic bishop (7th century), author of a Concordia Canonum, or collection of the laws of the church. Nothing is known of Corippus beyond what is contained in his own poems. He appears to have held the office of tribune or notary (scriniarius) under Anastasius, imperial treasurer and chamberlain of Justinian I, at the end of whose reign he left Africa for Constantinople, apparently in consequence of having lost his property during the Vandalic War and the subsequent Moorish revolts.

He was the author of two poems, of considerable importance for the history of the times. One of these, Iohannis ("Tale of John") or De Bellis Libycis ("On the Libyan war"), the earlier of the two, was not discovered till the beginning of the 19th century. The full text survived in one copy, called Trivultianus 686; it was made by Arezzo poet Giovanni De Bonis in late 14th century, and was rediscovered in 1814 "in the library of the Trivulzio family just outside Milan". The second copy was found in 16th century in the Corvinus library in Buda by Giovanni Cuspiniano; this copy was the only one that mentioned the poet's full name. The manuscript is now lost. Even the full text is fragmentary and contains a number of "lacunae", the most significant of them is the ending of the poem. It was dedicated to the nobles of Carthage and relates the overthrow of the Moors by John Troglita, magister militum of Africa in a series of battles that lasted until 548. Iohannis is in eight books (the last is unfinished) and contains about 5000 hexameters, or 4700 lines. The narrative commences with the despatch of John to the theatre of war by Justinian, and ends with the decisive victory near Carthage (548).

Although Johannes Cuspinianus in his De Caesaribus et Imperatoribus professed to have seen a manuscript of it in the library at Buda (destroyed by Suleiman I in 1527), it was not till 1814 that it was discovered at Milan by Cardinal Mazzucchelli, librarian of the Biblioteca Ambrosiana, from the codex Trivultianus (in the Biblioteca Trivulziana, the library of the marchesi Trivulzi), the only manuscript of the Johannis extant. The Johannis "is not only a valuable historic source but a work of marked poetic merit." It provides a description of the land and people of Late Roman Africa, which conscientiously records the impressions of an intelligent native observer; many of his statements as to manners and customs are confirmed both by independent ancient authorities (such as Procopius) and by our knowledge of the modern Berbers.

The other poem, In Laudem Iustini Augusti minoris ("In praise of the younger Justin"), in four books, contains the death of Justinian, the coronation of his successor Justin II (November 13, 565), and the early events of his reign. The work was published at Antwerp in 1581 by Michael Ruyz Azagra, secretary to Emperor Rudolf II, from a ninth- or tenth-century manuscript.

Virgil, Lucan, and Claudian were the poet's chief models. In laudem Iustini minoris, which was written when he was advanced in years, although marred by a "Byzantine" servility and gross flattery of a by no means worthy object, throws much light upon Late Roman court ceremony, as in the account of the accession of Justin and the reception of the embassy of the Avars. On the whole the language and metre of Corippus, considering the age in which he lived and the fact that he was not a native Italian, is remarkably pure. That he was a Christian is rendered probable by negative indications, such as the absence of all the usual mythological accessories of an epic poem, positive allusions to texts of Scripture, and a highly orthodox passage (In laudem Iustini minoris iv. 294 ff).

His "Panegyric" was written for Anastasius, a "Quaestor of the Sacred Palace and Master of Offices in the imperial capital".

== Editions ==
- Averil Cameron: Flavius Cresconius Corippus: In laudem Iustini Augusti minoris (in praise of Justin II). London 1976 (Translation and commentary).
- George W. Shea: The Iohannis or de Bellis Libycis of Flavius Cresconius Corippus (Studies in Classics 7). Lewiston/NY 1998 (Translation).
- J. Diggle and F.R.D. Goodyear (eds.): Iohannidos Libri VIII. Cambridge. 1970 (Latin Text).
- Bonn Corpus Scriptorum Historiae Byzantinae, volume 28/34, 1836: P. Mazzucchelli: Iohannis (orig. 1820); Pier Francesco Foggini, In laudem Iustini minoris (orig. 1777)
- Corippus. The Iohannis or De Bellis Libycus of Flavius Cresconius Corippus. Translated by George W. Shea.
- Corippus, Flavius Cresconius (1820). Flavii Cresconii Corippi Iohannidos: sev, De bellis libycis libri VII. editi ex Codici medilanensi mvsei Trivvltii. OL 25389817M.
- Corippi Africani Grammatici De laudibus Iustini Augusti minoris, heroico carmine, libri 4 (in Latin). ex officina Christophori Plantini, architypographi regij. 1581.

== Sources ==
- Cameron, Averil (1975). "Corippus' poem on Justin II: a terminus of antique art?". Annali della Scuola Normale Superiore di Pisa. Classe di Lettere e Filosofia. 5 (1): 129–165. ISSN 0392-095X. JSTOR 24300656.
- W. Ehlers, "Epische Kunst in Coripps Johannis," Philologus, 124 (1980), 109–135.
- John Martindale, The Prosopography of the Later Roman Empire, IIIa. (Cambridge, 1992), p. 354f.
- Heinz Hofmann, "Corippus, Flavius Cresconius," in Der Neue Pauly, Vol. 3 (1997), pp. 165f.
- J.U. Andres, Das Göttliche in der "Johannis" des Corippus. Antike Götterwelt und christliche Gottesvorstellung im Widerstreit? (Trier, 1997).
- V. Zarini, Rhétorique, poetiqué, spiritualité: La technique épique de Corippe dans la Johannide (Turnhout, 2003).
- Ch.O. Tommasi, "Exegesis by Distorting Pagan Myths in Corippus’ Epic Poetry," in Poetry and Exegesis in Premodern Latin Christianity: The Encounter between Classical and Christian Strategies of Interpretation. Eds. Willemien Otten and Karla Pollmann (Leiden and Boston: Brill, 2007) (Supplements to Vigiliae Christianae, 87).
- Gärtner, Thomas, Untersuchungen zur Gestaltung und zum historischen Stoff der "Johannis" Coripps (Berlin: de Gruyter, 2008) (Untersuchungen zur antiken Literatur und Geschichte, 90).
- C. Schindler, Per carmina laudes. Untersuchungen zur spätantiken Verspanegyrik von Claudian bis Coripp (Berlin/New York, 2009).
- Peter Riedlberger (ed.), Philologischer, historischer und liturgischer Kommentar zum 8. Buch der Johannis des Goripp nebst kritischer Edition und Übersetzung (Groningen: Egbert Forsten, 2010).
- Charlet, Jean-Louis. 1994. Corippe. In Encyclopédie berbère. Vol. 14. Edited by Gabriel Camps, 2104–2110. Leuven, Belgium: Peeters.
- Goldlust, Benjamin, ed. 2015. Corippe, un poète latin entre deux mondes. Lyon, France: CEROR.
- Krestan, Ludmilla and Klaus Winkler. 1957. Corippus. In Reallexikon für Antike und Christentum. Vol. 3, Edited by Franz Joseph Dölger, 424–429. Stuttgart: Hiersemann.
- Tandoi, Vincenzo. 1984. Corippo. In Enciclopedia virgiliana. Vol. 1. Edited by Francesco della Corte, 890–892. Rome: Istituto dell’Enciclopedia Italiana.
- Zarini, Vincent. 2015. La recherche sur Corippe: Bilan et perspectives. In Corippe, un poète latin entre deux mondes. Edited by Benjamin Goldlust, 15–30. Lyon, France: CEROR.
- Merrills, Andy (2023). War, Rebellion and Epic in Byzantine North Africa: A Historical Study of Corippus' Iohannis. Cambridge University Press. ISBN 978-1-009-39198-6.
- Merrills, Andy (2022). "A Subaltern's View of Early Byzantine Africa?: Reading Corippus as History" (PDF). Medieval Worlds. 16: 44–66. doi:10.1553/medievalworlds_no16_2022s44.
- Cameron, Averil (1980). "The Career of Corippus Again". The Classical Quarterly. 30 (2): 534–539. doi:10.1017/S0009838800042452. ISSN 0009-8388. JSTOR 638521.
- Baldwin, Barry (1988). "Corippus and Ennius". Illinois Classical Studies. 13 (1): 175–182. ISSN 0363-1923. JSTOR 23064072.
- Caramico, Giulia; Riedlberger, Peter (2009). "New evidence on the beginning of Iohannis, book v". Materiali e Discussioni per l'Analisi dei Testi Classici (63): 203–208. ISSN 0392-6338. JSTOR 27784324.
