= Justin II =

Roman emperor from 565 to 578

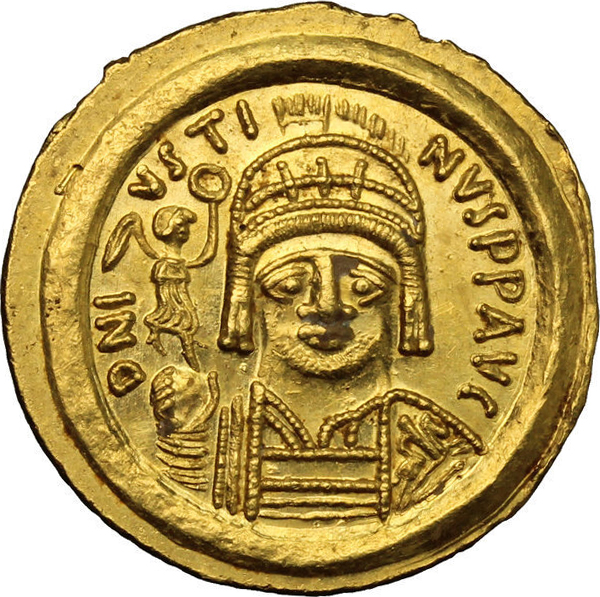
- Solidus of Justin II marked: d·n· iustinus p·p· aug·

Eastern Roman emperor
- Reign: 14 November 565 – 4 October 578
- Predecessor: Justinian I
- Successor: Tiberius II
- Born: Constantinople (now Istanbul, Turkey)
- Died: 4 October 578; Constantinople
- Spouse: Sophia
- Issue: Justus; Arabia; Tiberius II (adoptive)
Regnal name
- Imperator Caesar Flavius Iustinus Augustus (Note: The full imperial title of Justin II in Latin is attested in a novel issued on 1 March 570: Imperator Caesar Flavius Iustinus fidelis in Christo mansuetus maximus benefactor Alamannicus Gothicus Francicus Germanicus Anticus Vandalicus Africanus pius felix inclitus victor ac triumphator semper Augustus ("Emperor Caesar Flavius Justin, faithful in Christ, mild, majestic, greatest benefactor; victor over the Alamanni, Goths, Franks, Germans, Antes, Vandals, Africans; pious, fortunate, renowned, victorious and triumphant, ever augustus"). The victory titles are directly copied from Justinian.)
- Dynasty: Justinian
- Father: Dulcidio (or Dulcissimus)
- Mother: Vigilantia
- Religion: Chalcedonian Christianity

Justin II (Latin: Iustinus; Ancient Greek: Ἰουστῖνος, romanised: Ioustînos; died 4 October 578) was Eastern Roman emperor from 565 until 578. He was the nephew of Justinian I and the husband of Sophia, the niece of Justinian's wife Theodora.

Justin II inherited a greatly enlarged but overextended empire. He ended the payment of tributes and adopted a hardline stance against the empire's neighbours, which resulted in both the resumption of war with the Sassanid Empire in 572, with little success, as well as the initiation of the Byzantine-Lombard wars in 568, which eventually cost the Romans much of their territory in Italy. His later reign was marked by severe mental illness. He was the last person to rule the entire Italian peninsula until Napoleon.

== Family ==
He was a son of Vigilantia and Dulcidio (sometimes rendered as Dulcissimus), respectively the sister and brother-in-law of Justinian. His siblings included Marcellus and Praejecta. With Sophia he had a daughter Arabia and possibly a son, Justus, who died young. He also had a niece named Helena.

== Early life ==
Justin's early years are largely obscure. A thirteenth-century chronicle suggests 511 as Justin's birth date, but its reliability is not known with certainty. Historian Ernst Stein assumes he was born by 520 at the latest, as his contemporary Corippus compliments his "excellent" age at his accession in 565. At some point, he married Sophia, possibly in the 540s.

During Justinian's reign, he served in the position of curopalates at the court. He is first attested in the contemporary sources from 552 and 553 as being part of the embassy to Pope Vigilius during the Three-Chapter Controversy.

In 559, he was sent by Justinian to escort the Kutrigur raiders retreating across the Danube. In 562 and 563, he was in charge of dissipating the urban riots caused by the Blues and Greens in Constantinople.

Over time, he built a network of supporters in the court. In the early 560s, his wife Sophia and his supporters were said to have pleaded with Justinian to name him Caesar, albeit unsuccessfully. Historian Sihong Lin writes that early on, Justin was seen as an "energetic, even well-liked individual."

== Reign ==
=== Accession ===
Justinian I died childless on 14 November 565. Callinicus, the praepositus sacri cubiculi, seems to have been the only witness to his dying moments, and claimed that Justinian had designated Justin, his nephew, as his heir in a deathbed decision. This sidelined another relative and candidate for the throne, also named Justin, who was son of Germanus, cousin of Justinian. Modern historians suspect Callinicus may have fabricated the last words of Justinian to secure the succession for his political ally. As historian Robert Browning observed: "Did Justinian really bring himself in the end to make a choice, or did Callinicus make it for him? Only Callinicus knew."

In any case, Callinicus started alerting those most interested in the succession, originally various members of the Senate. Then they jointly informed Justin and Sophia, offering the throne. Justin accepted after the traditional token show of reluctance, and with his wife Sophia, he was escorted to the Great Palace of Constantinople. The Excubitors blocked the palace entrances during the night, and early in the morning, John Scholasticus, Patriarch of Constantinople, crowned the new Augustus. Only then was the death of Justinian and the succession of Justin publicly announced in the Hippodrome of Constantinople. Justin's coronation was written in detail by Corippus in his panegyric In laudem lustini Augusti minoris (In praise of Justin the Younger).

Both the Patriarch and Tiberius, commander of the Excubitors, had been recently appointed, with Justin having played a part in their respective appointments, in his role as Justinian's curopalates. It is thus seen that they were willing to elevate their patron and ally to the throne.

Justin's first address to the senate contained criticisms of Justinian: "Let the world rejoice that whatever was not done or put into practice because of our father's old age has been corrected in the time of Justin." In the speech, he vowed to repay debts, restore the emptied treasury and promised not to confiscate senatorial properties.

=== Early reign ===
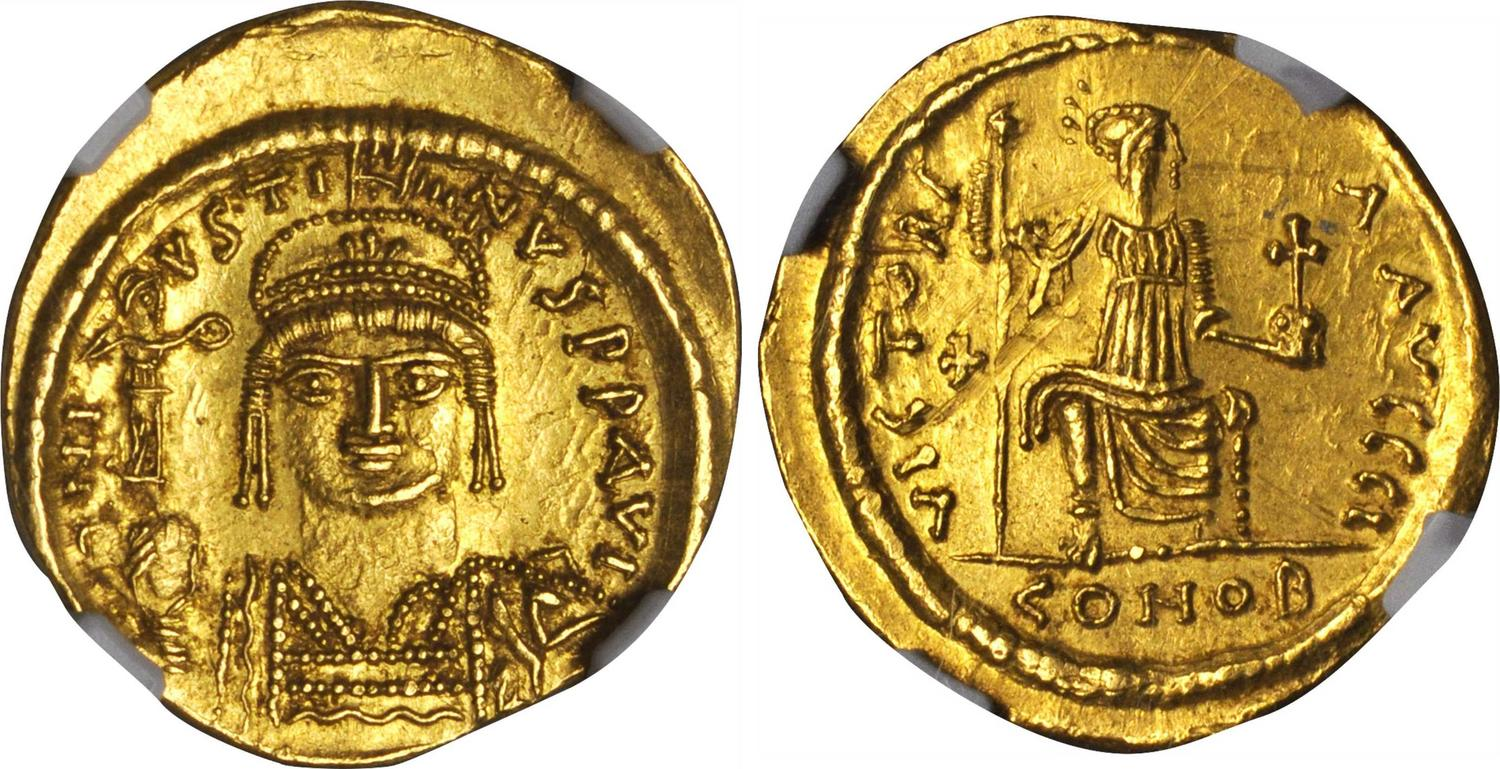
Solidus minted in Alexandria, Egypt c. 570

In the early days of his reign, Justin took a sharp about-turn from his uncle's policies. He repaid the treasury's debts and took a more reconciliatory stance toward the senatorial class. On 1 January 566, he became a consul, thereby reviving a post Justinian had discontinued since 541. Justin and Sophia initially promised to make peace with Justin's cousin and rival to the throne, Justin (son of Germanus), but had him assassinated in Alexandria not long after. According to a hostile source, the imperial couple kicked his severed head.

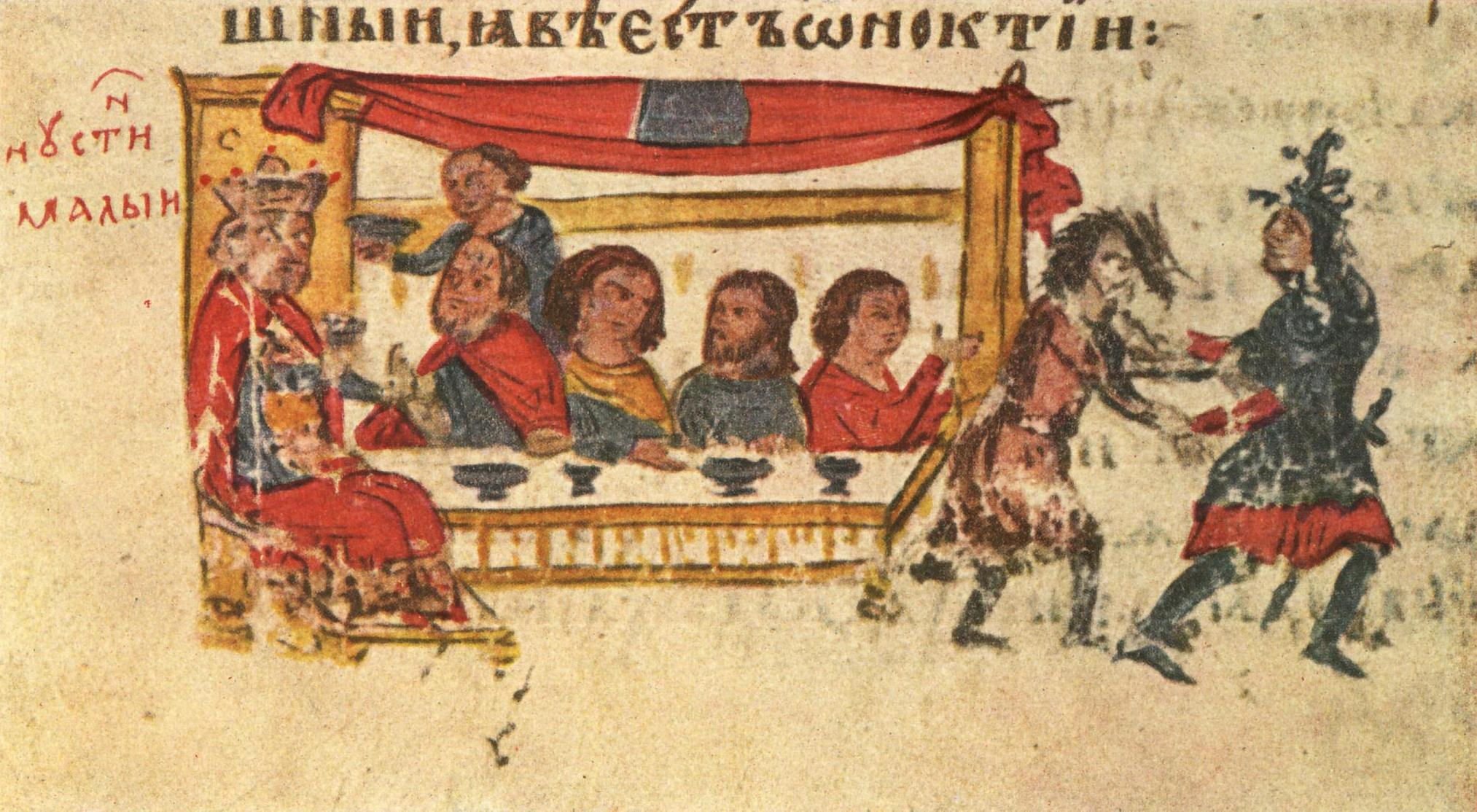
Justin II ordering the arrest of Justin the Consul. Scene from the 12th century Manasses Chronicle.

In 566 he reversed Justinian's ban on divorce by mutual consent, arguing that it resulted in spouses hating each other.

Mankind has nothing more admirable than marriage: from it stem children and successive generations, the peopling of villages and cities, and society's best bond. Hence, it is our prayer that marriage should be so successful for those contracting it as never to be the work of an unlucky daemon, and that married couples should not split up without just cause for their marriage to be dissolved. But as it is difficult for this to be maintained for all mankind – in such a large population, it is outside the realms of possibility that some unreasonable enmities should not supervene – we have thought it appropriate to devise some remedy for this, in particular where the consequences of pettiness have escalated so far as to engender real, irreconcilable hatred between the partners.

=== Administration and financial policy ===
After Justin paid off the debts, he burned the bonds of the treasury. He additionally remitted his subjects' tax arrears back to 560. The contemporary John of Ephesus notes a rumour that his successor Tiberius II discovered piles of money Justin and Sophia gathered, possibly meaning that his reign generated a surplus.

He conceded greater control to the provincial elites. In 569, he allowed them to nominate their own governors, and if the nominees pleased the court, eliminated their appointment fees, resulting in decreased imperial oversight of the provinces.

=== Foreign policy ===
He discontinued Justinian's practice of buying off potential enemies. Immediately after his accession, Justin halted the payment of subsidies to the Avars, ending a truce that had existed since 558. This move upset the delicate balance of power in the Pannonian Basin, since the Avar elites were forced to seek new sources of wealth to maintain their position and client networks. At first, this was agreeable for the Romans, since the Avars decided to raid the Franks instead of going into the Roman territory. But after the Avars and the neighbouring tribe of the Lombards had combined to destroy the Gepids, from whom Justin had obtained the Danube fortress of Sirmium and the Gepid treasury, Avar pressure caused the Lombards to migrate West, and in 568 they invaded Italy under their king Alboin. They quickly overran the Po Valley, and within a few years acquired a vast share of the Italian Peninsula. The Avars themselves crossed the Danube in 573 or 574, when the Empire's attention was distracted by troubles on the Persian frontier. They were only placated by the payment of a subsidy of 80,000 solidi by Justin's successor Tiberius.

The North and East frontiers were the main focus of Justin's attention. Justin began to cement an alliance with the Turks, the new Central Asian power that threatened both the Avars and Persia from the mid 6th century. In line with his policies against subsidies, he rejected Arab demands of payments. In 572 his refusal to pay tribute to the Persians in combination with overtures to the Turks led to a war with the Sassanid Empire. After two disastrous campaigns, in which the Persians under Khosrow I overran Syria and captured the strategically important fortress of Dara, Justin became inflicted with a severe mental illness. During his incapacitation, his wife Sophia reversed his tributary policy by attaining a one-year truce from Persia with a payment of 45,000 gold coins. This was followed by a three-year truce when Tiberius reached an agreement to pay 30,000 coins annually. Further negotiations had the Romans recognising Persian dominance of Eastern Armenia and Iberia, though the wars continued in Armenia.

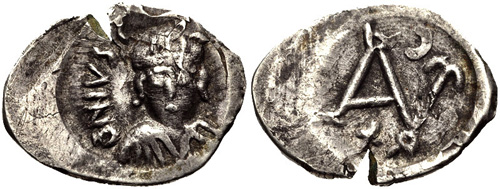
100 nummi coin of Justin II minted in Carthage. Helmeted and cuirass-wearing facing bust, holding shield Monogram; cross above, 100 below

Shortly after the smuggling of silkworm eggs into the Byzantine Empire from China by Nestorian Christian monks, the 6th-century Byzantine historian Menander Protector writes of how the Sogdians attempted to establish a direct trade of Chinese silk with the Byzantine Empire. After forming an alliance with the Sassanid ruler Khosrow I to defeat the Hephthalite Empire, Istämi, the Göktürk ruler of the Western Turkic Khaganate, was approached by Sogdian merchants requesting permission to seek an audience with the Sassanid king of kings for the privilege of traveling through Persian territories in order to trade with the Byzantines. Istämi refused the first request, but when he sanctioned the second one and had the Sogdian embassy sent to the Sassanid king, the latter had the members of the embassy poisoned to death. Maniah, a Sogdian diplomat, convinced Istämi to send an embassy directly to Constantinople, which arrived in 568 and offered not only silk as a gift to Justin, but also proposed an alliance against Sassanid Persia. Justin agreed and sent an embassy to the Turkic Khaganate, ensuring the direct silk trade desired by the Sogdians.

His foreign policy has received unfavourable modern assessments. In 1937, historian Previte-Orton criticised Justin as lacking realism, having overestimated Roman strength against foreign enemies. (Note: Previte-Orton describes Justin as "a rigid man, dazzled by his predecessor's glories, to whom fell the task of guiding an exhausted, ill-defended Empire through a crisis of the first magnitude and a new movement of peoples". Previte-Orton continues, "In foreign affairs he took the attitude of the invincible, unbending Roman, and in the disasters which his lack of realism occasioned, his reason ultimately gave way. It was foreign powers which he underrated and hoped to bluff by a lofty inflexibility, for he was well aware of the desperate state of the finances and the army and of the need to reconcile the Monophysites.") Peter Sarris also suggests that some of Justin II's actions, such as abandoning anti-corruption measures implemented by Justinian, and gifting his senatorial friends tax handouts worsened the empire's situation. According to Warren Treadgold, contemporaries blamed Justin's arrogance and parsimony for the disaster that the empire faced at the hands of the Persians.

== Succession and death ==
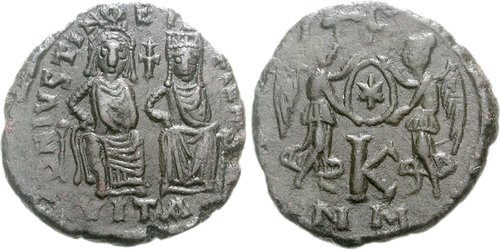
Justin II and Sophia depicted on a Nummi coin

After 572, Justin was reported to have fits of insanity. John of Ephesus, whose Monophysite sect suffered persecutions under Justin, offered a vivid description of Justin's madness, in which he behaved like a wild animal, was wheeled about on a mobile throne and required organ music to be played day and night.

Despite moments of clarity, Justin was no longer able to govern. Eastern Roman sources report that Tiberius, the commander of the Excubitors, directed the government from this point, alongside Sophia. In 574, about a year after his incapacitation, Justin elevated Tiberius as Caesar at Sophia's suggestion and adopted him as his son. On 7 December, according to Theophylact Simocatta, Justin remained sufficiently clear-minded to make an eloquent speech as he passed the crown:

You behold the ensigns of supreme power. You are about to receive them, not from my hand, but from the hand of God. Honor them, and from them you will derive honor. Respect the empress your mother: you are now her son; before, you were her servant. Delight not in blood; abstain from revenge; avoid those actions by which I have incurred the public hatred; and consult the experience, rather than the example, of your predecessor. As a man, I have sinned; as a sinner, even in this life, I have been severely punished: but these servants (and he pointed to his ministers), who have abused my confidence, and inflamed my passions, will appear with me before the tribunal of Christ. I have been dazzled by the splendor of the diadem: be thou wise and modest; remember what you have been, remember what you are. You see around us your slaves, and your children: with the authority, assume the tenderness, of a parent. Love your people like yourself; cultivate the affections, maintain the discipline, of the army; protect the fortunes of the rich, relieve the necessities of the poor.

However, as time passed Justin's mental health grew worse and he became suicidal, asking for people to kill him with a sword, "for death, he would say, is better for me than a life of such anguish and agony". Four years after he made Tiberius Caesar, Justin begun to suffer from bladder stones. His physicians performed surgery on him, but the process was a failure and the cuts sustained from the surgery were fatal. As his death became inevitable, on 26 September 578, in a moment of lucidity, he elevated Tiberius as Augustus. According to John of Ephesus, he said to Tiberius:

I, my son, am dying: go now, take the royal crown, but be on thy guard, that thou be not guilty of sin, and provoke God to anger: and consult for the good of the kingdom of the Romans.

Justin died only nine days later, on 4 October 578.

== Sources ==
=== Primary sources ===
- The Third Part of the Ecclesiastical History of John, Bishop of Ephesus: Now First Translated from the Original Syriac. Translated by Smith, R. Payne. Oxford University Press. 1860.
- The Ecclesiastical History of Evagrius: A History of the Church from AD 431 to AD 594. Translated by Walford, Edward. 1846.
- Lingenthal, C. E. Z. (1857). Jus Graeco-Romanum: Novellae Constitutiones. T. O. Weigel.

=== Secondary sources ===
- Browning, Robert (2003), Justinian and Theodora, Gorgias Press LLC, ISBN 1-59333-053-7
- Corippus; Cameron, Averil (1976). In laudem lustini Augusti minoris. Translated by Cameron, Averil. London: Bloomsbury. ISBN 978-04-85-11157-6.
- Dagnall, Lewis (2024). "The Empress Sophia and East Roman Foreign Policy" (PDF). In Rollinger, Christian; Viermann, Nadine (eds.). Empresses-in-Waiting: Female Power and Performance at the Late Roman Court. Women in Ancient Cultures. Liverpool: Liverpool University Press. ISBN 978-1-80207-593-9.
- Evans, James Allan Stewart (1996), The age of Justinian: the circumstances of imperial power, Routledge, ISBN 0-415-23726-2
- Garland, Lynda (1999), Byzantine empresses: women and power in Byzantium, AD 527–1204, CRC Press, ISBN 0-203-02481-8
- Kaldellis, Anthony (2023). The New Roman Empire. Oxford University Press. ISBN 978-0197549322.
- Lin, Sihong (2021). "Justin under Justinian: The Rise of Emperor Justin II Revisited". Dumbarton Oaks Papers. 75.
- Martindale, John R., ed. (1980). "Vigilantia". The Prosopography of the Later Roman Empire: Volume II, AD 395–527. Cambridge: Cambridge University Press. p. 1165. ISBN 0-521-20159-4.
- Martindale, John R., ed. (1992). "Iustinus 5". The Prosopography of the Later Roman Empire: Volume III, AD 527–641. Cambridge: Cambridge University Press. pp. 754–756. ISBN 0-521-20160-8.
- Meyendorff, John (1989). Imperial unity and Christian divisions: The Church 450–680 A.D. The Church in history. Vol. 2. Crestwood, NY: St. Vladimir's Seminary Press. ISBN 978-0-88-141056-3.
- Nicholson, Oliver; Canepa, Matthew; Daryaee, Touraj (2018). "Khosrow I Anoshirvan". In Nicholson, Oliver (ed.). The Oxford Dictionary of Late Antiquity. Oxford: Oxford University Press. ISBN 978-0-19-866277-8.
- Ostrogorsky, George (1956). History of the Byzantine State. Oxford: Basil Blackwell.

Justin II Justinian dynasty Died: 578
Regnal titles
Preceded by Justinian I	Byzantine emperor 565–578 with Tiberius II Constantine (574–578)	Succeeded by Tiberius II Constantine
Political offices
Preceded by Anicius Faustus Albinus Basilius in 541, then lapsed	Roman consul I 566	Succeeded by Justinus Augustus in 566
Preceded by Justinus Augustus in 568	Roman consul II; 568	Succeeded by Tiberius Constantinus Augustus in 579
