= Helladia =

Helladia may refer to:

- Helladia (beetle), a genus
- Helladia (stage artist), 5th-century Roman pantomime performer
