= John Crucis =

7th century demarch of the Greens

John Crucis (also John Kroukis; Greek: Ἰωάννης ὁ ἐπίλην Κροῦκις; d. 603) was a Byzantine rebel, arsonist and demarch of the Greens. He was appointed demarch by Emperor Phocas in late 602. However, he soon led the Greens in a riot, committing arson throughout large areas of Constantinople. In 603, he was publicly burned alive on the orders of Phocas.

== Biography ==
Theophanes the Confessor records that, in 602, the Greens appealed to the emperor Maurice, saying "Constantine and Domentziolus, (Note: This Domentziolus (or Domniziolus) was Constantine Lardys' subordinate, and had been the director of the Hormisdas Palace and an ambassador for Maurice.) o three-times august master of the Romans, are agitating your own deme so that Crucis might become our demarch on account of our sins". (Note: Greek: Κωνσταντῖνος καὶ Δομεντζίoλος, δέσποτα Ῥωμαίων τρισαύγουστε, τῷ οἰκείῳ σου δήμῳ παρενοχλοῦσιν, ἵνα ὁ Κρούκης διοικήσῃ, εἰς ἃς ἔχομεν ἁμαρτίας.) The Greek could alternatively be punctuated to read "Constantine and Domentziolus, o three-times august master of the Romans, are agitating your own colour. Let Crucis be our manager!" (Note: Greek: Κωνσταντῖνος καὶ Δομεντζίoλος, δέσποτα Ῥωμαίων τρισαύγουστε, τῷ οἰκείῳ σου δήμῳ παρενοχλοῦσιν. Ἵνα ὁ Κρούκης διοικήσῃ εἰς ἃς ἔχομεν ἁμαρτίας.) The former interpretation implies that Crucis was appointed demarch against the Greens' wishes, while the latter implies that the Greens were divided between a pro-Crucis and an anti-Crucis faction. Historian David Michael Olster hypothesised that the pro-Crucis faction included Germanus' agent Hebdomites, while the anti-Crucis faction was supported by Sergius (Crucis' predecessor as demarch), Constantine Lardys, and Domentziolus.

Shortly after Maurice's overthrow and murder by Phocas, Crucis was appointed to replace Sergius, the first known demarch of the Greens. However, Crucis soon led the Greens in a riot, in which they set fire to a large area around the Mese, from the Palace of Lausus and the praetorium in the east as far as the Forum of Constantine in the west. This riot was notorious enough to be mentioned by Jacob, the author of the Doctrina Jacobi, who wrote "When Phocas became emperor in Constantinople, as a Green I betrayed Blue Christians, and denounced them as Jews and mamzirs. And when the Greens under Crucis burnt the Mese and perpetrated evil, as a Blue I again beat up Christians, insulting them as Greens and denouncing them as incendiaries and Manichaeans."

The Chronicon Paschale states that Crucis was "was burnt in the Mese between the praetorium of the city prefect and the Forum." Most historians interpret this to mean that Crucis was captured by Phocas and publicly executed by burning. This was in line with other cruelties perpetrated against the Greens by Phocas, who according to Theophanes "maimed many persons and hung their limbs in the Sphendone, while others he beheaded and others he put in sacks and drowned in the sea." These orders were carried out by Cosmas, possibly the former Blue demarch whom Phocas had appointed as urban prefect.

== Sources ==
- Booth, Phil (2011). "Shades of Blues and Greens in the Chronicle of John of Nikiou". Byzantinische Zeitschrift. 104 (2): 555–602. doi:10.1515/BYZS.2011.013.
- Cameron, Alan (1976). Circus Factions: Blues and Greens at Rome and Byzantium. Oxford: Clarendon Press. ISBN 978-0198148043.
- Janssens, Yvonne (1936). "LES BLEUS ET LES VERTS SOUS MAURICE, PHOCAS ET HERACLIUS". Byzantion (in French). 11 (2): 499–536.
- Jones, A. H. M.; Martindale, J. R; Morris, John (1992). The Prosopography of the Later Roman Empire. Vol. III: A.D. 527–641. Oxford University Press. ISBN 978-0-521-20160-5.
- Olster, David Michael (1993). The Politics of Usurpation in the Seventh Century: Rhetoric and Revolution in Byzantium. ISBN 978-9025610104.
- Theophanes (1997) [815]. The Chronicle Of Theophanes Confessor, Trans. By Cyril Mango (1997). Translated by Mango, Cyril.
- Theophanes (1883) [815]. Carolus, de Boor (ed.). Theophanis chronographia.
- Whitby, Michael; Whitby, Mary (1989). Chronicon Paschale 284-628 AD (PDF).
