= Helladia (beetle) =

Scientific classification
- Kingdom: Animalia
- Phylum: Arthropoda
- Class: Insecta
- Order: Coleoptera
- Suborder: Polyphaga
- Infraorder: Cucujiformia
- Family: Cerambycidae
- Subfamily: Lamiinae
- Genus: Helladia; Fairmaire, 1864

Species
- See text

Genus of beetles

Helladia is a genus of beetles in the subfamily Lamiinae.

== Species ==
- Helladia adelpha
- Helladia ferrugata
- Helladia flavescens
- Helladia humeralis
- Helladia imperialis
- Helladia millefolii
- Helladia praetextata
