= Helladia humeralis =

Scientific classification
- Domain: Eukaryota
- Kingdom: Animalia
- Phylum: Arthropoda
- Class: Insecta
- Order: Coleoptera
- Suborder: Polyphaga
- Infraorder: Cucujiformia
- Family: Cerambycidae
- Genus: Helladia
- Species: H. humeralis

Binomial name
- Helladia humeralis (Waltl, 1828)

Species of beetle

Helladia humeralis is a species of longhorn beetle in the subfamily Lamiinae found in Iran, Turkey and the Near East. The length of the species is 5–12 millimetres (0.20–0.47 in). It is black in colour with orange legs and antennae. Adults are on the wing from April to June. It feeds on Centaurea hyalolepis, which is also its host plant.
