= John of Epiphania =

Sixth-century Byzantine historian

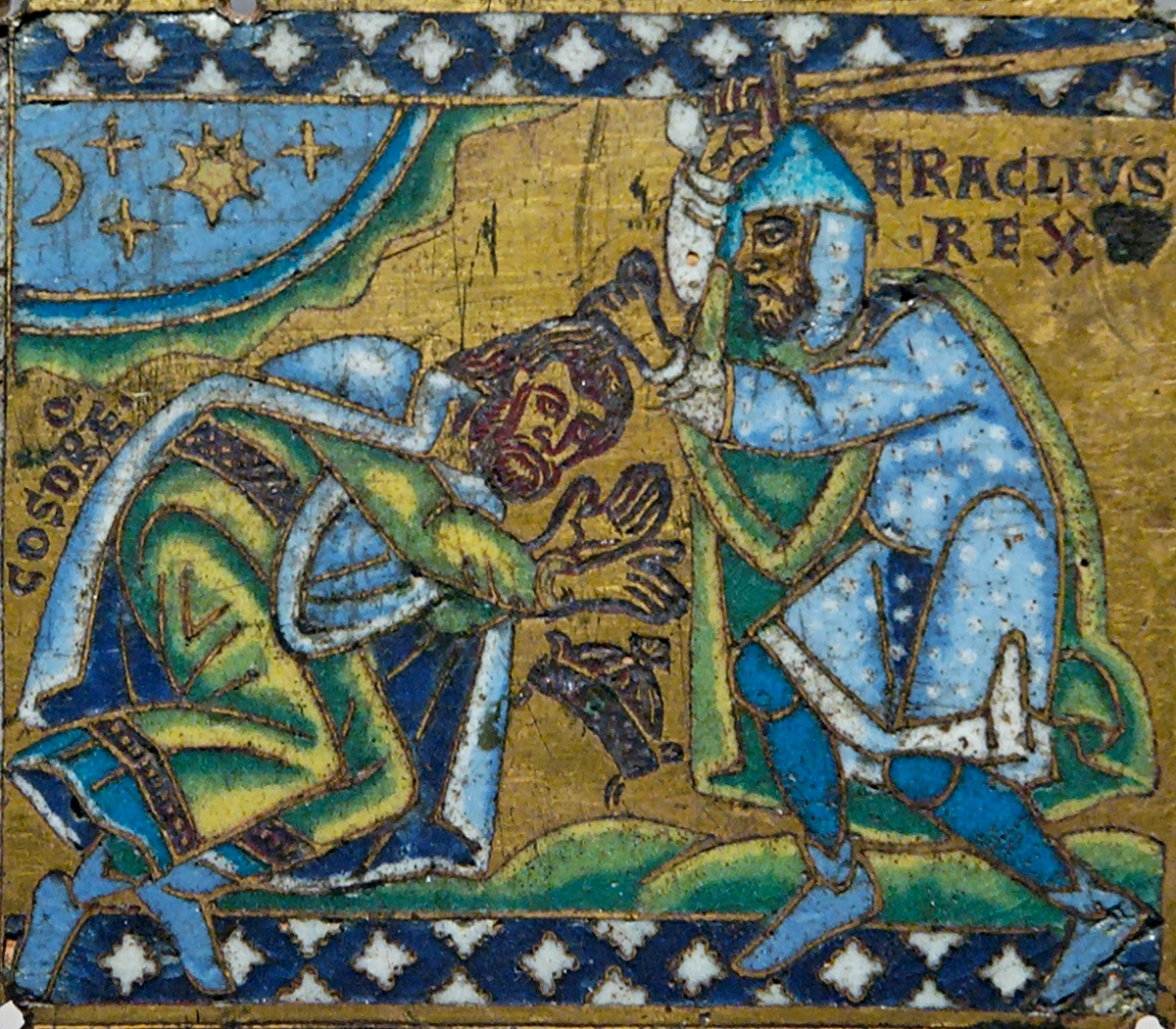
John records Khosrau's restoration to the Persian throne by Maurice. However, Khosrau would use Maurice's murder in 602 as an excuse to resume war with the Byzantines. Khosrau is seen here, finally defeated by Heraclius in the Battle of Nineveh.

John of Epiphania (Greek: Ιωάννης Επιφανεύς) was a late sixth century Byzantine historian.

John was born in Epiphania (modern Hama, Syria). He was a Christian and served as a legal counselor to the Patriarch of Antioch, Gregory (ca. 590). John was also a cousin of the church historian Evagrius Scholasticus.

John obviously received good training. In his role as legal adviser, he was a witness to the Persian king, Khosrau Parvez's retreat into Roman territory, and may have even met the king. Khosrau was restored to the Persian throne by the Roman emperor Maurice. John may have also visited Persia (cf. Fragment 1)

John wrote a history of the Byzantine-Persian wars; from the campaigns of Khosrau I against Justin II, to the flight of his grandson Khosrau II to the Byzantines. The work is lost, but a fragment is preserved. The history was used by Evagrius and Theophylact Simocatta. As with many other Byzantine works, it is written in an archaic form of Greek, meant to imitate the classical style (e.g. Thucidydes).
