= Nakla el-Anab =

Nakla el-Anab نكلا العنب
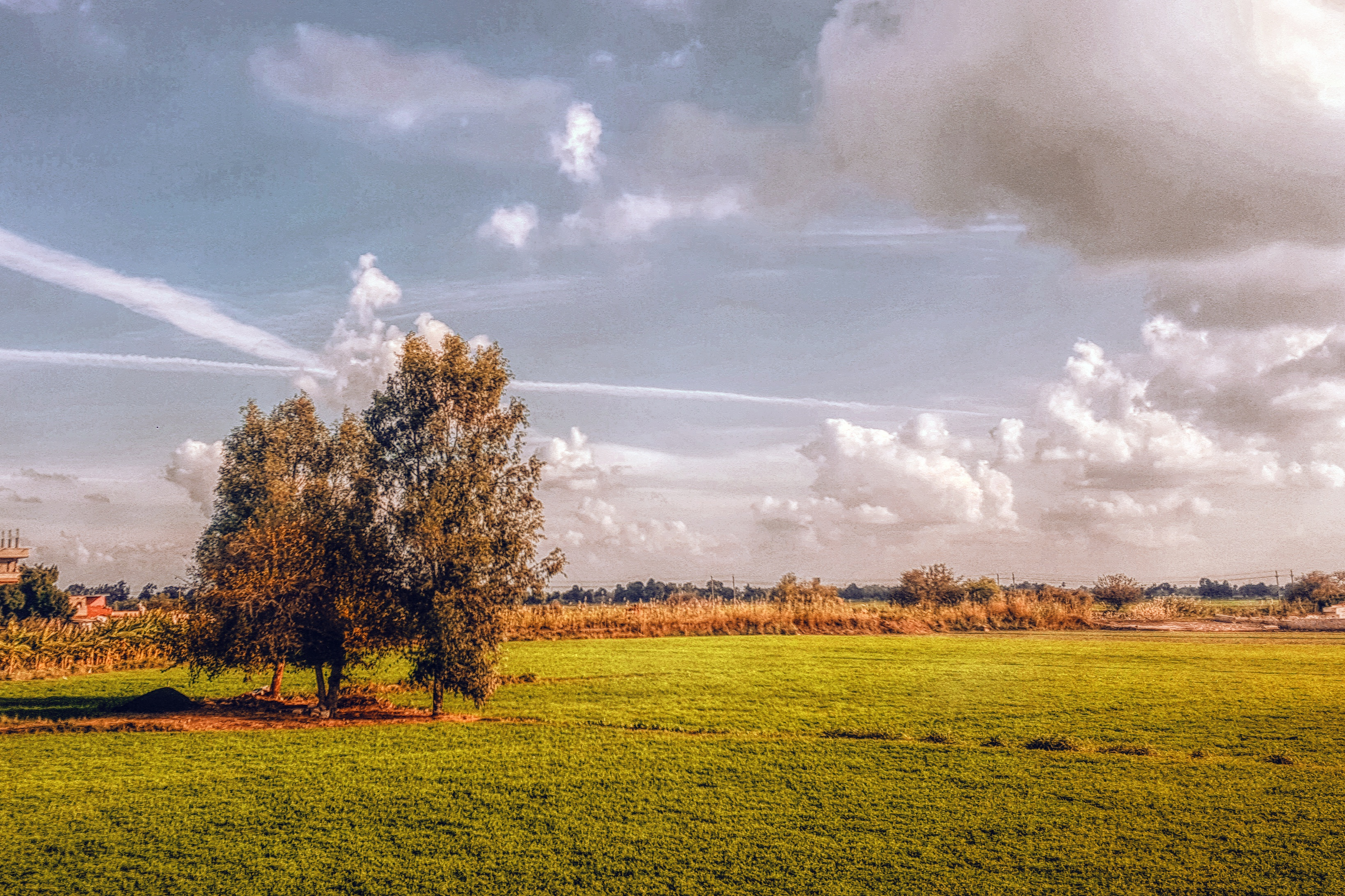
- Landscape in the vicinity of the town

- Location in Egypt
- Coordinates: 30°54′42.69″N 30°45′30.75″E
- Country: Egypt
- Governorate: Beheira

Population (2006)
  - Total: 22,208
- Time zone: UTC+2 (EET)
  - Summer (DST): UTC+3 (EEST)

Nakla el-Anab (Arabic: نكلا العنب) is a village in the Beheira Governorate of Egypt. According to the 2006 statistics, the total population of Nakla el-Anab was 22,208 people, including 11,639 men and 10,569 women.

== History ==
Muhammad Ramzi identified it with Aykelah (Arabic: أكيلا), a town mentioned by John of Nikiou, which was a birthplace of a Byzantine topoteretes Abaskiron and became a scene of rebellion against the emperor Maurice. After the suppression of the rebellion the town was reportedly set to flames.

He also reports about a conflict that existed between the inhabitants of Nakla and Sais, which revolved around an island between the two towns, which is today called Gazirat Nakla.

"The grapes" (Arabic: العنب, romanized: el anab) suffix was added to the village's name in the Ottoman period.
