= Praetoria of Constantinople =

Court and jail in Constantinople

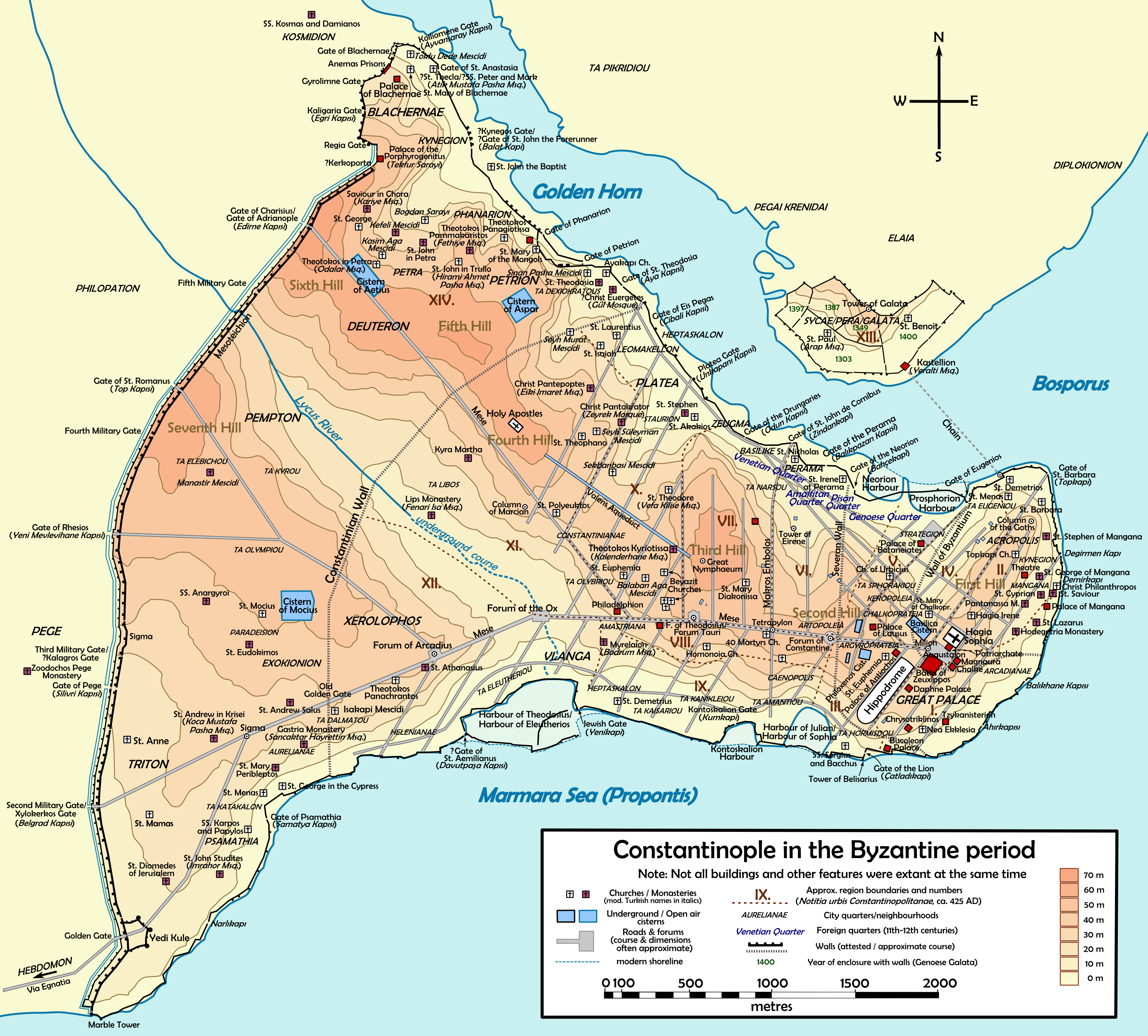
Map of Byzantine Constantinople. The first praetorium of the city lay to the northeast of the Hagia Sophia, the second between the Augustaion and the Forum of Constantine.

The Praetoria of Constantinople (Latin: Praetorium Constantinopolis; Ancient Greek: Πραιτώριον Κωνσταντινουπόλεως) were the places in Byzantine Constantinople where the urban prefect (commonly called in English the Eparch from his Greek title (Ancient Greek: ἔπαρχος τῆς πόλεως, romanized: eparchos tēs poleōs)) resided and dispensed justice. Jails were annexed to the praetoria. At least two buildings functioning as praetorium existed in the city.

== Location ==
During the Byzantine period of its history, Constantinople had at least two praetoria. According to Raymond Janin, the first one lay to the northeast of the Hagia Sophia, in the first region of the city, while the second praetorium was located to the northwest of the first, between the Augustaion and the Forum of Constantine. According to another hypothesis, it is possible that the large remains of buildings pulled down in 1875 near the Türbe of Mehmed Fuad Pasha and the Sokollu Mehmet Pasha Mosque belonged to the second praetorium and to the nearby Church of Hagia Anastasia.

== History ==
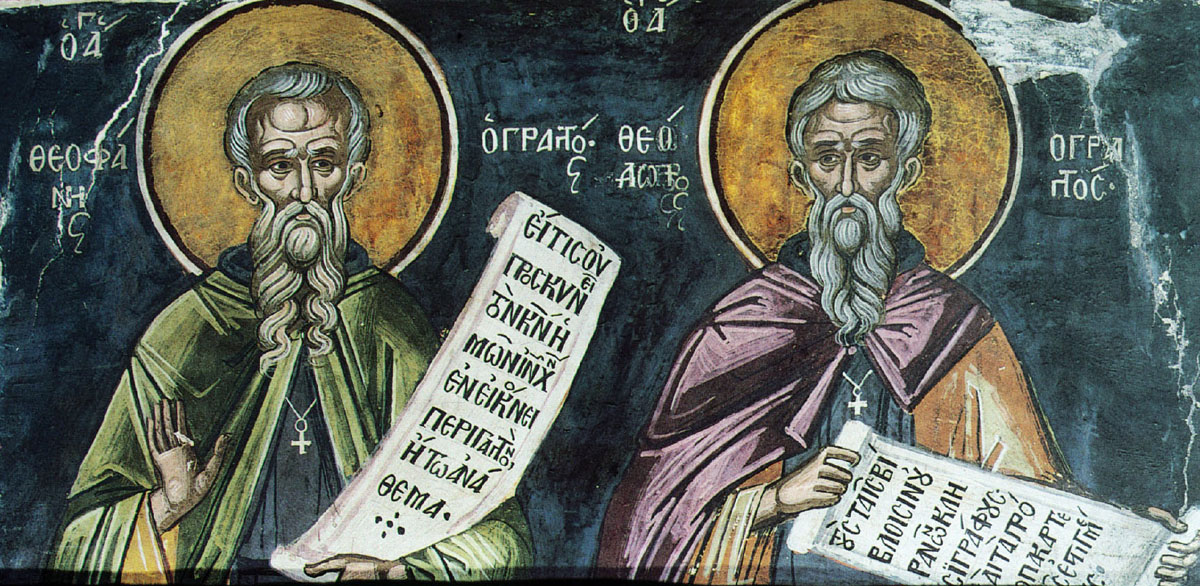
Theodorus and Theophanes were imprisoned and branded in the praetorium.

In Constantinople at least two praetoria are mentioned by the sources.

=== First Praetorium ===
The first praetorium was established by Constantine the Great (r. 306–337) or possibly – predating the foundation of Constantinople – by Septimius Severus (r. 193–211), as part of his reconstruction of Byzantium. It was destroyed by fire a first time in 407 AD, during a revolt against Monaxius, the then urban prefect, and a second time in January 532, during the Nika riots against Emperor Justinian I (r. 527–565), always by fire.

This praetorium had a jail, which according to John the Lydian was carved out by Justinian's minister, John the Cappadocian, within the building. There, prisoners were regularly tortured and executed. John the Lydian asserts that John the Cappadocian extracted money from his victims and gives an eyewitness testimony to the execution of one such victim. During the iconoclast persecutions in the 8th and 9th centuries, the jail hosted 432 monks who refused to abandon image worship, turning the building into a veritable monastery. During the reign of Phocas (r. 602–610), a noblewoman named Maré or Marcia, whose house lay near the prison, moved with compassion because of the awful conditions of the prisoners and the stench coming from the nearby building, offered her house as a new prison. The Emperor accepted her offer, but paid for her building. The prison was a place of suffering: among the tortured, St. Stephen the Younger, after spending eleven months in jail, died because of the torments. His body was pulled by the populace with a rope tied to the feet and thrown in a place named ta Pelagiou, where the criminals were dumped after their execution. Under Theophilos (r. 829–842) two brothers, Theodorus and Theophanes, were imprisoned in the praetorium, and after being summoned before the urban prefect and having refused to take the Eucharist with the iconoclasts, were ordered by him to be branded on their forehead and torso with twelve iambic verses written by the Emperor. Because of that, they were nicknamed the Graptoi (lit. 'the ones written upon' in Greek).

=== Second Praetorium ===
The second praetorium already existed under Justinian I. It was also burned during the revolt of Nika, with the fire spreading from the Forum of Constantine to the Chalke. This praetorium burned a second time under Phocas, during an uprising of the Green faction of the Hippodrome. The fire extended along the Mese (the main thoroughfare of the city), from the Palace of Lausus to the Ark in Constantine's Forum: among the victims was John Kroukis, the chief of the Greens. In 695, Leontius (r. 695–698), at that time strategos (military governor) of the theme of Hellas in southern Greece, landed in the Kontoskalion harbour and freed many soldiers imprisoned in the building, and with them he assaulted the Great Palace and deposed the Emperor. In 781, Empress Irene of Athens (r. 780–802) publicly whipped and imprisoned in the praetorium the wife and children of Elpidius, governor of Sicily, who had been accused of rebellion against her. In the eleventh century, Theodosios, proedros and cousin of Constantine IX Monomachos (r. 1042–1055), rebelled against Michael VI Bringas (r. 1056–1056) and freed the prisoners of the praetorium's jail, inviting them to join him.

The 10th-century scholar-emperor Constantine VII Porphyrogennetos (r. 913–959) reports that during his time, the praetorium functioned as a prison for Arab prisoners of war. A mosque was also built at or near the building. Constantine VII claimed that it was built at the request of Maslama ibn Abd al-Malik, commander of the Umayyad army during the Siege of Constantinople in 717–718. Although the legend of Maslama's construction of a mosque in Constantinople is also found in contemporary Arab sources, it was most likely built at a much later date, when a sizeable Muslim community, of merchants, captives, exiles and other travellers, established itself in the city.

== Sources ==
- Canard, Marius (1926). "Les expéditions des Arabes contre Constantinople dans l'histoire et dans la légende". Journal Asiatique (in French) (208): 61–121. ISSN 0021-762X. Archived from the original on 2019-04-17.
- Janin, Raymond (1950). Constantinople Byzantine (in French) (1 ed.). Paris: Institut français d'etudes byzantines.
- Guilland, Rodolphe (1959). "L'Expedition de Maslama contre Constantinople (717–718)". Études byzantines (in French). Paris: Publications de la Faculté des Lettres et Sciences Humaines de Paris: 109–133. OCLC 603552986.
- Heather, Peter J.; Moncur, David (2001). Politics, Philosophy, and Empire in the Fourth Century: Select Orations of Themistius. Liverpool University Press. ISBN 978-0-85323-106-6.
- Müller-Wiener, Wolfgang (1977). Bildlexikon zur Topographie Istanbuls: Byzantion, Konstantinupolis, Istanbul bis zum Beginn d. 17 Jh (in German). Tübingen: Wasmuth. ISBN 978-3-8030-1022-3.
- Martindale, John R., ed. (1992). The Prosopography of the Later Roman Empire: Volume III, AD 527–641. Cambridge: Cambridge University Press. ISBN 0-521-20160-8.
- Lilie, Ralph-Johannes; Ludwig, Claudia; Pratsch, Thomas; Zielke, Beate (1999). Prosopographie der mittelbyzantinischen Zeit: 1. Abteilung (641–867), Band 1: Aaron (# 1) – Georgios (# 2182) (in German). Berlin and Boston: De Gruyter. pp. 486–487. ISBN 978-3-11-015179-4.
- Senina, Tatiana (2008). "La confession de Théophane et Théodore les Graptoi: remarques et précisions". Scrinium. Journal of Patrology and Critical Hagiography (in French). 4 (1): 260–298. doi:10.1163/18177565-90000188.
- Treadgold, Warren (1988). The Byzantine Revival, 780–842. Stanford, California: Stanford University Press. ISBN 978-0-8047-1462-4.
