= Helladia ferrugata =

Scientific classification
- Domain: Eukaryota
- Kingdom: Animalia
- Phylum: Arthropoda
- Class: Insecta
- Order: Coleoptera
- Suborder: Polyphaga
- Infraorder: Cucujiformia
- Family: Cerambycidae
- Genus: Helladia
- Species: H. ferrugata

Binomial name
- Helladia ferrugata (Ganglbauer, 1884)

Species of beetle

Helladia ferrugata is a species of longhorn beetle in the subfamily Lamiinae found in Lebanon and Syria. The length of the species is 7–13 millimetres (0.28–0.51 in). It is black coloured with orange legs. Adults are on wing from April to June. It feeds on Centaurea species, from where it also develops.
