= Helladia imperialis =

Scientific classification
- Domain: Eukaryota
- Kingdom: Animalia
- Phylum: Arthropoda
- Class: Insecta
- Order: Coleoptera
- Suborder: Polyphaga
- Infraorder: Cucujiformia
- Family: Cerambycidae
- Genus: Helladia
- Species: H. imperialis

Binomial name
- Helladia imperialis Sama et Rejzek, 2001

Species of beetle

Helladia imperialis is a species of longhorn beetle in the subfamily Lamiinae that is endemic to Iran. The species is 9–14 millimetres (0.35–0.55 in) in length and is blackish-orange coloured. Adults are on wing from May to July, and it feeds on Centaurea imperialis.
