= Theophylact Simocatta =

Early 7th-century Byzantine historian

Theophylact Simocatta (Medieval Greek: Θεοφύλακτος Σιμοκάτ(τ)ης Theophýlaktos Simokát(t)ēs; Latin: Theophylactus Simocatta; (Note: His byname literally means 'snub-nosed cat' in Medieval Greek. Other forms of the name are Simocattos and Simocatos.) c. 589 – after 641) was an early seventh-century Byzantine historiographer, arguably ranking as the last historian of late antiquity, writing in the time of Heraclius (c. 630) about the late Emperor Maurice (582–602).

== Biography ==
Unlike contemporary chroniclers like Agathias and Menander, Theophylact did not include a preface with personal information in his History. As such, little is known about his life, besides what he occasionally remarks in passing throughout his writings. He was likely born towards the end of the 580s. He mentions that he was born in Egypt, and that his relative Peter was the prefect of Egypt in 602, from which it can be inferred that he was from a high-ranking Egyptian family. He may have studied at the University of Alexandria, then headed by the philosopher Stephen, whom Theophylact seems to allude to in the introductory Dialogue of his History. At around the age of twenty, shortly after the overthrow of Phocas by Heraclius in 610, Theophylact moved to Constantinople, where he pursued a highly successful legal and administrative career, eventually attaining the ranks of ex-praefectus and magister scrinii. He is mentioned in a 641 inscription from Aphrodisias in Caria, indicating that he was still alive at the time.

== Works ==
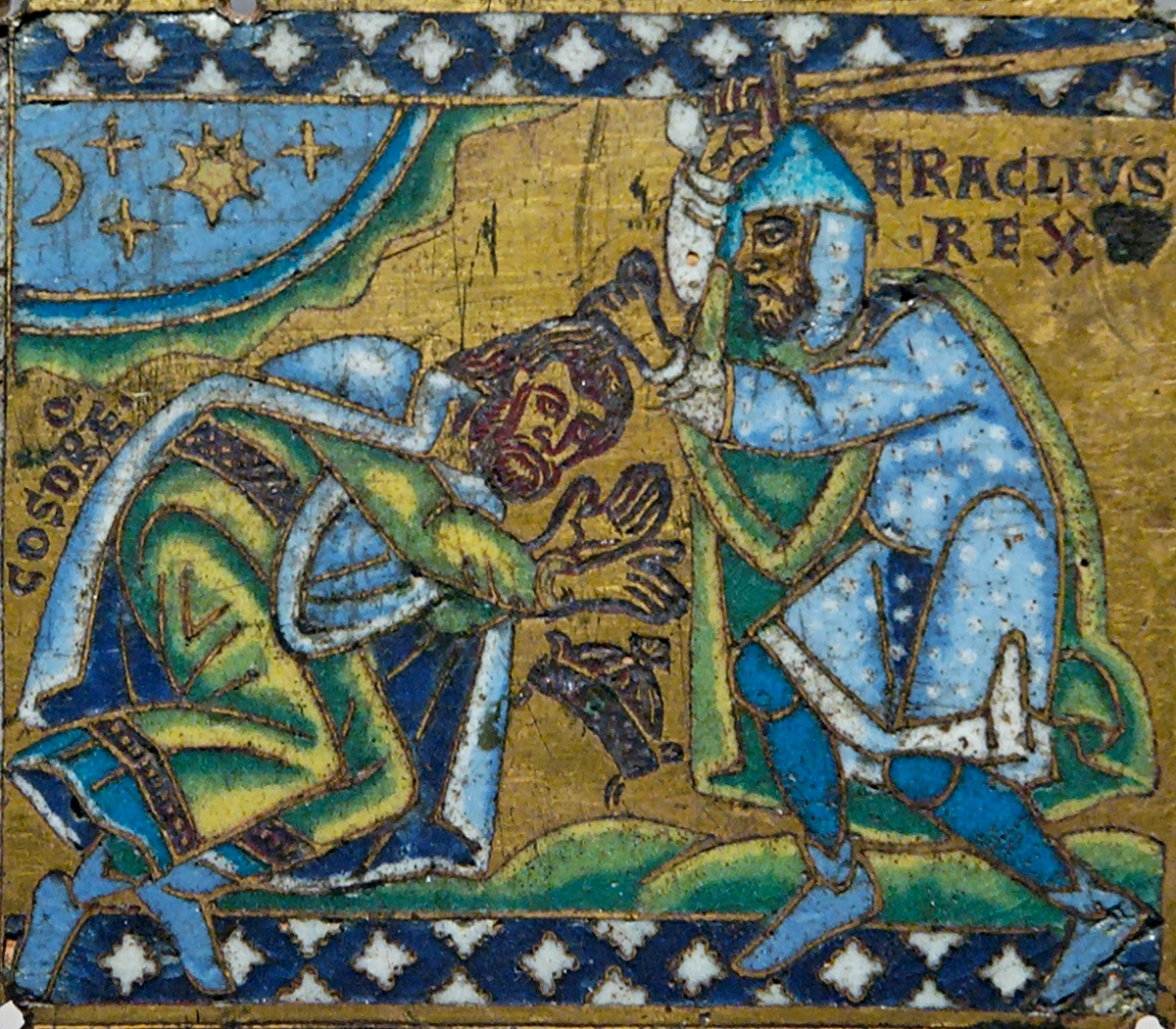
Byzantine Emperor Heraclius receiving the submission of the Sassanid king Khosrau II – during Simocatta's times (plaque from a cross. Champlevé enamel over gilt copper, 1160–1170, Meuse Valley). Housed at the Louvre.

Simocatta is best known as the author of History, a work split into eight books, about the reign of the emperor Maurice (582–602), for which period he is the best and oldest authority. Though his work is of lesser stature than that of Procopius and his self-consciously classicizing style is pompous, he is an important source of information concerning the seventh-century Slavs, the Avars and the Persians, and the emperor's tragic end. (Note: Important editions published in 1609, ed. pr. by J. Pontanus, and C.G. de Boor in 1887.) He mentions the war of Heraclius against the Persians (610–628), but not that against the Arabs (beginning 629), so it is likely that he was writing around 630. Among his sources he used the history of John of Epiphania.

Edward Gibbon wrote of Theophylact "His want of judgement renders him diffuse in trifles and concise in the most interesting facts". This notwithstanding, Simocatta's general trustworthiness is admitted. The history contains an introduction in the form of a dialogue between History and Philosophy. It alludes to Patriarch Sergius I of Constantinople as the man who encouraged the composition of the History, and possibly commissioned Theophylact to complete it.

Nicolaus Copernicus translated Greek verses by Theophylact into Latin prose and had his translation, dedicated to his uncle Lucas Watzenrode, published in Kraków in 1509 by Johann Haller. It was the only book that Copernicus ever brought out on his own account.

Simocatta was also the author of Physical Problems, a work on natural history, and of a collection of 85 essays in epistolary form. (Note: The best edition is published in the prestigious Bibliotheca Teubneriana: Zanetto 1985. The letters were translated into Latin by Copernicus in 1509, reprinted in 1873 by F. Hipler in Spicilegium Copernicanum. See also Zanetto 2013)

In regards to the Far East, Simocatta wrote a generally accurate depiction of the reunification of China by Emperor Wen (r. 581–604 AD) of the Sui dynasty, with the conquest of the rival Chen dynasty in southern China, correctly placing these events within the reign period of Byzantine ruler Maurice. Simocatta also provided cursory information about the geography of China along with its customs and culture, deeming its people "idolatrous" but wise in governance. He also related how the ruler was named Taisson, the meaning of which was "Son of God", possibly derived from Chinese Tianzi (Son of Heaven, a title of the emperor of China) or even the name of the contemporaneous ruler Emperor Taizong of Tang.

== Sources ==
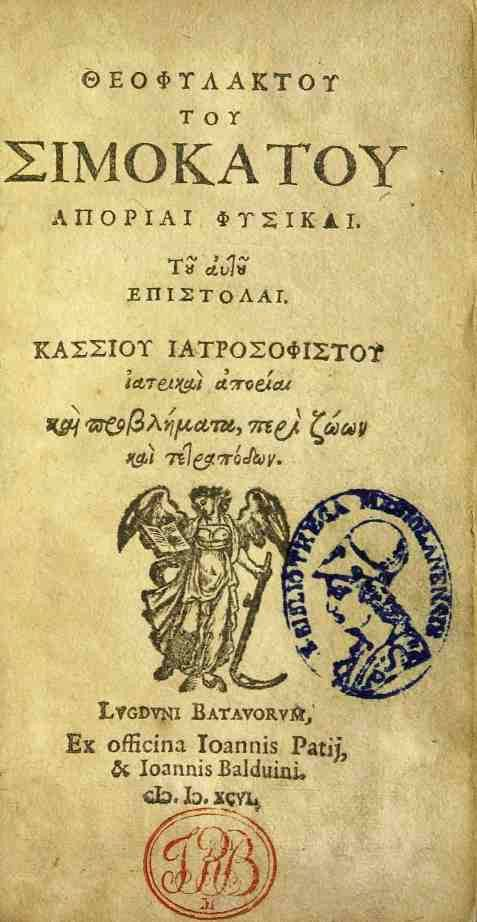
Quaestiones physicae, 1597

=== By Theophylact ===
- Simocatta, Theophylact (March 1986) [630]. The History of Theophylact Simocatta - An English Translation with Introduction and Notes. Translated by Whitby, Michael; Whitby, Mary. Oxford University Press. ISBN 9780198227991.
- Quaestiones physicae (in Latin). Leiden: Jan Paedts Jacobszoon. 1597.
- Simocatta, Theophylact (1841) [630]. Julius Ludwig, Ideler (ed.). Physici et medici Graeci minores (in Greek).
- Zanetto, Ioseph [Giuseppe] (1985). "Theophylacti Simocatae epistulae" [The Letters of Theophylactus Simocata]. Bibliotheca Scriptorum Graecorum et Romanorum Teubneriana (in Greek and Latin). Leipzig: BSB B.G. Teubner Verlagsgesellschaft. ISSN 0233-1160.
- Zanetto, Giuseppe (2013). "Romanzo greco ed epistolografia: il caso di Teofilatto Simocatta". Lettere, mimesi, retorica: studi sull'epistolografia letteraria greca di età imperiale e tardoantica. Lecce–Brescia: Pensa Multimedia. pp. 469–491. ISBN 978-88-6760-097-7.

=== Secondary sources ===
- Armitage, Angus (1947). The World of Copernicus. Mentor Books. ISBN 9780854097371.
- Jones, A. H. M.; Martindale, J. R; Morris, John (1992). The Prosopography of the Later Roman Empire. Vol. III: A.D. 527–641. Oxford University Press. ISBN 978-0-521-20160-5.
- Frendo, Joseph D.C. (1988). History and Panegyric in the Age of Heraclius: The Literary Background to the Composition of the 'Histories' of Theophylact Simocatta (PDF).
- Gibbon, Edward (1997) [1782]. History Of The Decline And Fall Of The Roman Empire.
- Yule, Henry (1915). Cordier, Henri (ed.). Cathay and the Way Thither: Being a Collection of Medieval Notices of China, Vol I: Preliminary Essay on the Intercourse Between China and the Western Nations Previous to the Discovery of the Cape Route.
