= Abaskiron =

Egyptian military tribune

- Born: 6th century
- Died: Alexandria
- Occupations: topoteretes and tribune

Abaskiron (Greek: Ἄπα Ἰσχυρίων Apa Ischyrion) was an Egyptian topoteretes and/or tribune in Byzantine Egypt, active in the Diocese of Egypt during the 6th century. He and his family rebelled against the Byzantine emperor Maurice (r. 582–602). The main source about him is John of Nikiû.

== Biography ==
Abaskiron was reportedly a native of Aykilah (Zawiya), a town in the vicinity of Alexandria in Egypt. He was born to a wealthy family, the eldest of three brothers. His younger brothers were Menas and Iacobus (Jacob, James). He also had a son, Isaac.

Abaskiron is first mentioned as a scribe. He might have been a scholastic (schoolman) and/or grammarian. John, the praefectus augustalis (Augustal Prefect, governor of Egypt) appointed Abaskiron, Menas, Iacobus and Isaac as overseers over areas of Egypt. They used their position to perform unauthorized attacks on the local representatives of the Blue faction, going as far as sacking the towns of Bana and Bousir. They set fire on the Thermae of Bousir.

The local prefect of Bousir managed to escape to Constantinople, reporting the situation to Emperor Maurice (r. 582–602). Maurice directed John to dismiss Abaskiron and his family from service. They reacted by openly rebelling against Maurice. They led armed followers in seizing the grain ships heading to Alexandria, resulting in a famine within the capital of Egypt. The population of Alexandria rose against John, blaming him for the famine. His life was reportedly rescued by loyal members of the Coptic Church. John was briefly replaced by Paul, but then was reinstated and tasked with ending the rebellion.

The activities of the rebels extended throughout Egypt. They continued to seize grain ships and confiscate imperial revenues with Isaac managing to form a naval fleet and raid Cyprus. His ships patrolled the Egyptian coast and attacked all ships still in imperial service. Eulogius of Alexandria (term 581–607) was sent to negotiate with the insurgents, to no real effect.

John finally moved against them, alongside the general Theodore. By then, Abaskiron and his family controlled most of Lower Egypt. Theodore deduced that supporters of the rebellion were partly motivated by the recent arrest and imprisonment of two highly respected figures: Cosmas, son of Samuel and Banon, son of Ammon. He arranged for the release of the duo. Cosmas and Banon joined the Byzantine army in search of the Egyptian insurgents. The rival forces set camp on opposing sides of the Nile River. According to historian Edith L. Butcher, Cosmas and Banon "addressed the insurgents from across the river, entreating them to return to their allegiance, assuring them that the Roman Empire was not yet enfeebled or conquered, and that their ultimate success was impossible." This encouraged many of Abaskiron's supporters to defect towards Theodore's camp.

Butcher also states that: "The three brothers were left alone with their immediate adherents, but they boldly endeavoured to stand their ground, and met the attack of the Byzantine army with desperate courage. They fought till night fell, and then fled from the field to Abu San." When Theodore managed to set fire to the rebel camp, more of Abaskiron's followers deserted. "Here [in Abu San] they made a brief halt, but with daylight discovered that they were pursued by the Byzantine army. The gallant little band retreated fighting towards Alexandria, but they were at length overpowered, and all three brothers, with Isaac, were taken prisoners".

After being captured, Abaskiron and his brothers "were placed on camels and paraded about the streets of Alexandria, that all men might know the revolt had come to an end. Then they were thrown into prison; but the prefect, John, stood their friend as much as he dared, and no further steps were taken against them till long afterwards." They were eventually executed under the orders of the new prefect Constantine, who succeeded John. "This man cut off the heads of the three brothers, and sent Isaac into exile. The same prefect, probably acting under orders from the Emperor, who had evidently, neither forgotten nor forgiven the revolt, though he had not dared to use harshness at the time, confiscated the goods of the chief men who had taken part in it, and delivered the towns of Aykelah and Abu San to the flames."

== Bibliography ==
- Butcher, Edith Louisa (1897). The Story of the Church of Egypt: An Outline Of The History Of The Egyptians Under Their Successive Masters From The Roman Conquest Until Now. London, United Kingdom: Smith, Elder, & Company.
- Martindale, John Robert; Jones, Arnold Hugh Martin; Morris, J., eds. (1992). The Prosopography of the Later Roman Empire. Vol. III: A.D. 527–641. Cambridge, United Kingdom: Cambridge University Press. ISBN 978-0-521-20160-5.
