= Helladia adelpha =

Scientific classification
- Domain: Eukaryota
- Kingdom: Animalia
- Phylum: Arthropoda
- Class: Insecta
- Order: Coleoptera
- Suborder: Polyphaga
- Infraorder: Cucujiformia
- Family: Cerambycidae
- Genus: Helladia
- Species: H. adelpha

Binomial name
- Helladia adelpha (Ganglbauer, 1884)

Species of beetle

Helladia adelpha is a species of beetle in the subfamily Lamiinae, found in the Near East and Turkey. The length of the species is 7–12 millimetres (0.28–0.47 in). It is black coloured with brown legs. Adults are on wing from April to June.
