= Gavro Manojlović =

Croatian Serb historian (1856–1939)

- Born: 27 October 1856; Zadar, Dalmatia, Austrian Empire (now Zadar, Croatia)
- Died: 1 November 1939 (aged 83); Zagreb, Kingdom of Yugoslavia (now Zagreb, Croatia)

Gavro Manojlović (27 October 1856 – 1 November 1939) was a Croatian Serb historian, politician, and academic.

== Biography ==
Gavro Manojlović was born in Zadar to a family of Serbian descent. He studied in Zagreb and Vienna, where he received his doctorate in philosophy of history and classical philology in 1896. From 1880 he worked as a high school teacher and as a school principal in Požega, Osijek and Zagreb. From 1902, he was a full professor of general history of the ancient world at the Faculty of Philosophy in Zagreb. He studied ancient history, Byzantine studies, philosophy of history. Manojlović also wrote a number of textbooks.

On two occasions, from 1908 to 1910 and from 1913 to 1918, he was a representative of the Croat-Serb Coalition in the Croatian Parliament. Manojlović signed an open letter of support for Serbian members of the Croat-Serb Coalition slandered by Unionist Ban Pavao Rauch, for which he was suspended and prematurely retired from his university post, in a crackdown of the government on opposition intellectuals.

As one of the prominent supporters of Yugoslavism, in 1918, Manojlović was a member of the National Council of Slovenes, Croats and Serbs, and in 1919 a member of the Temporary National Representation of the Kingdom of Serbs, Croats and Slovenes.

From 1908, he was a regular member, and from 1924 to 1933 the president of the Croatian Academy of Sciences and Arts. He founded the HAZU Oriental Collection.

He was the editor of the youth newspaper Pobratim and Nastavni vjesnik.

== Publications ==
=== Poetry Collections ===
- Mladi dani Veljkovi ("Young Days of Veljkovi", 1880)

=== History ===
- O godini prijenosa sv. Anastazije u Zadar ("About the Year of Transfer of St. Anastasia in Zadar", 1901)
- Jadransko pomorje IX. stoljeća : u svjetlu istočno-rimske (bizantinske) povijesti ("Adriatic Sea IX Century: In the Light of Eastern Roman (Byzantine) History", 1902)
- Povijest staroga Orijenta ("History of the Ancient Orient", 1923)
- Sile pokretnice i pravilnosti u univerzalnoj historiji ("Driving Forces and Regularities in Universal History", 1927)

== Sources ==
- Tomašegović, Nikola (2022). "The Many Faces of Yugoslavism: A Case Study of Two Croatian Historians in the Transition from the Habsburg Monarchy to the Yugoslav State". Historical Journal. 75 (1). Croatian Historical Society. ISSN 1849-0824 – via Hrčak.
