= Phytoecia flavescens =

Scientific classification
- Domain: Eukaryota
- Kingdom: Animalia
- Phylum: Arthropoda
- Class: Insecta
- Order: Coleoptera
- Suborder: Polyphaga
- Infraorder: Cucujiformia
- Family: Cerambycidae
- Genus: Phytoecia
- Species: P. flavescens

Binomial name
- Phytoecia flavescens (Brullé, 1833)

Synonyms
- Saperda flavescens Brullé, 1833; Helladia flavescens (Brullé) Fairmaire, 1864; Mallosia flavescens (Brullé) Mulsant, 1853

Species of beetle

Phytoecia flavescens is a species of beetle in the family Cerambycidae. It was described by Brullé in 1833, originally under the genus Saperda. It is known from Macedonia and Greece. It contains the varietas Phytoecia flavescens var. fumigata.
