= Phytoecia millefolii =

Scientific classification
- Domain: Eukaryota
- Kingdom: Animalia
- Phylum: Arthropoda
- Class: Insecta
- Order: Coleoptera
- Suborder: Polyphaga
- Infraorder: Cucujiformia
- Family: Cerambycidae
- Genus: Phytoecia
- Species: P. millefolii

Binomial name
- Phytoecia millefolii (Adams, 1817)

Synonyms
- Saperda azurea Steven, 1817; Saperda millefolii Adams, 1817; Phytoecia excelsa Stierlin, 1876; Phytoecia azurea (Steven) Faldermann, 1837; Helladia millefolii (Adams) Pic, 1903

Species of beetle

Phytoecia millefolii is a species of beetle in the family Cerambycidae. It was described by Adams in 1817, originally under the genus Saperda. It has a wide distribution between Europe and the Middle East.

== Subspecies ==
- Phytoecia millefolii millefolii Adams, 1817
- Phytoecia millefolii alziari (Sama, 1992)
