= Phytoecia praetextata =

Scientific classification
- Domain: Eukaryota
- Kingdom: Animalia
- Phylum: Arthropoda
- Class: Insecta
- Order: Coleoptera
- Suborder: Polyphaga
- Infraorder: Cucujiformia
- Family: Cerambycidae
- Genus: Phytoecia
- Species: P. praetextata

Binomial name
- Phytoecia praetextata (Steven, 1817)

Synonyms
- Saperda praetextata Steven, 1817; Helladia praetextata (Steven, 1817)

Species of beetle

Phytoecia praetextata is a species of beetle in the family Cerambycidae. It was described by Steven in 1817, originally under the genus Saperda. It is known from Turkey, Bulgaria, Syria, Armenia, Romania, and Ukraine.

== Subspecies ==
- Phytoecia praetextata praetextata Steven, 1817
- Phytoecia praetextata nigricollis Pic, 1892
