= Jacques Jarry =

French linguist and archeologist (1929–2023)

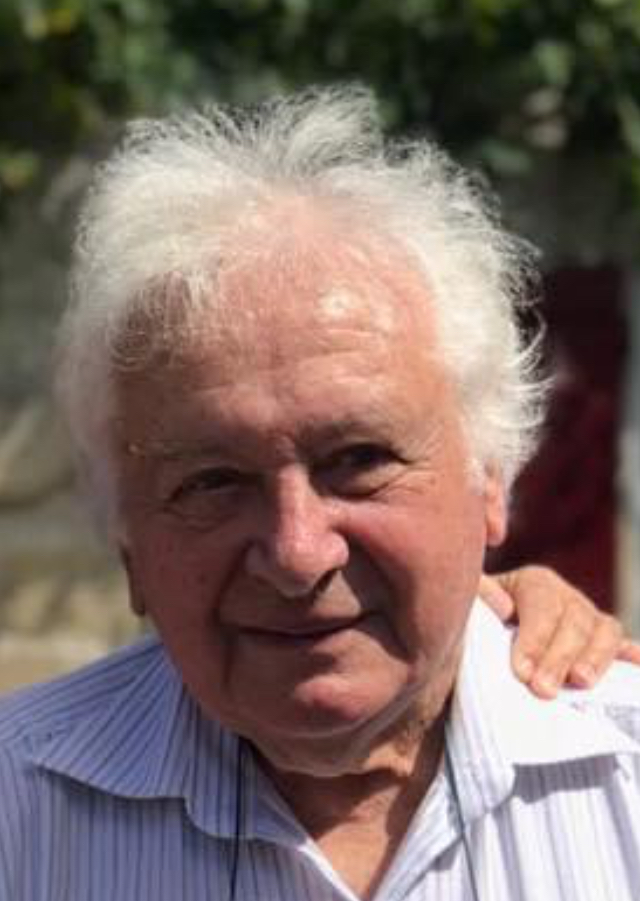
- Jarry in 2021
- Born: 17 October 1929; Niort, France
- Died: 18 January 2023 (aged 93); Vouillé, Deux-Sèvres, France
- Education: École normale supérieure
- Occupations: Linguist; Archeologist

Jacques Jarry (17 October 1929 – 18 January 2023) was a French linguist and archeologist.

== Biography ==
Born in Niort on 17 October 1929, Jarry attended secondary school in Paris before entering the École normale supérieure in 1949. After that, he became an honorary member of the Institut du Caire and practiced archeology in France, Egypt, and the Middle East. A linguist and interpreter, he was fluent in fifteen languages: Japanese, Korean, Russian, German, Italian, Spanish, English, Arabic, Latin, ancient and modern Greek, and French.

During the 1960s, Jarry lived in Lebanon, where he married and saw the birth of his first child, a daughter. In 1965, he went to Egypt and participated in archeological excavations. He was then sent to Nigeria and Japan, where he settled and started a new family. He returned to France in 1975 and obtained a teaching position at the Lycée de Melle. He participated in excavations with secondary school students, including along the Niort ring road.

Jarry lived in France throughout the 1980s, where he carried out excavations along the A10 autoroute in Deux-Sèvres. During this era, he also spent time in Japan, where he worked as a professor and interpreter at Hiroshima University. He retired in 2009 and lived near Niort, where he wrote a book titled Inscriptions latines et étrangères du Poitou. Throughout his career, his work on archeological excavations gained international renown. During his retirement, he examined the Glozel artifacts and shed new light on their linguistics. He shared his findings at the science festival in Faye-l'Abbesse in 2009.

Jarry died in Vouillé, Deux-Sèvres on 18 January 2023, at the age of 93.

== Publications ==
- Hérésies et factions dans l'empire byzantin du IVe au VIIe siècle (1968)
- Hannya Shinghyo - The most famous of the sutras in Japan (2013)
