= Helladia (stage artist) =

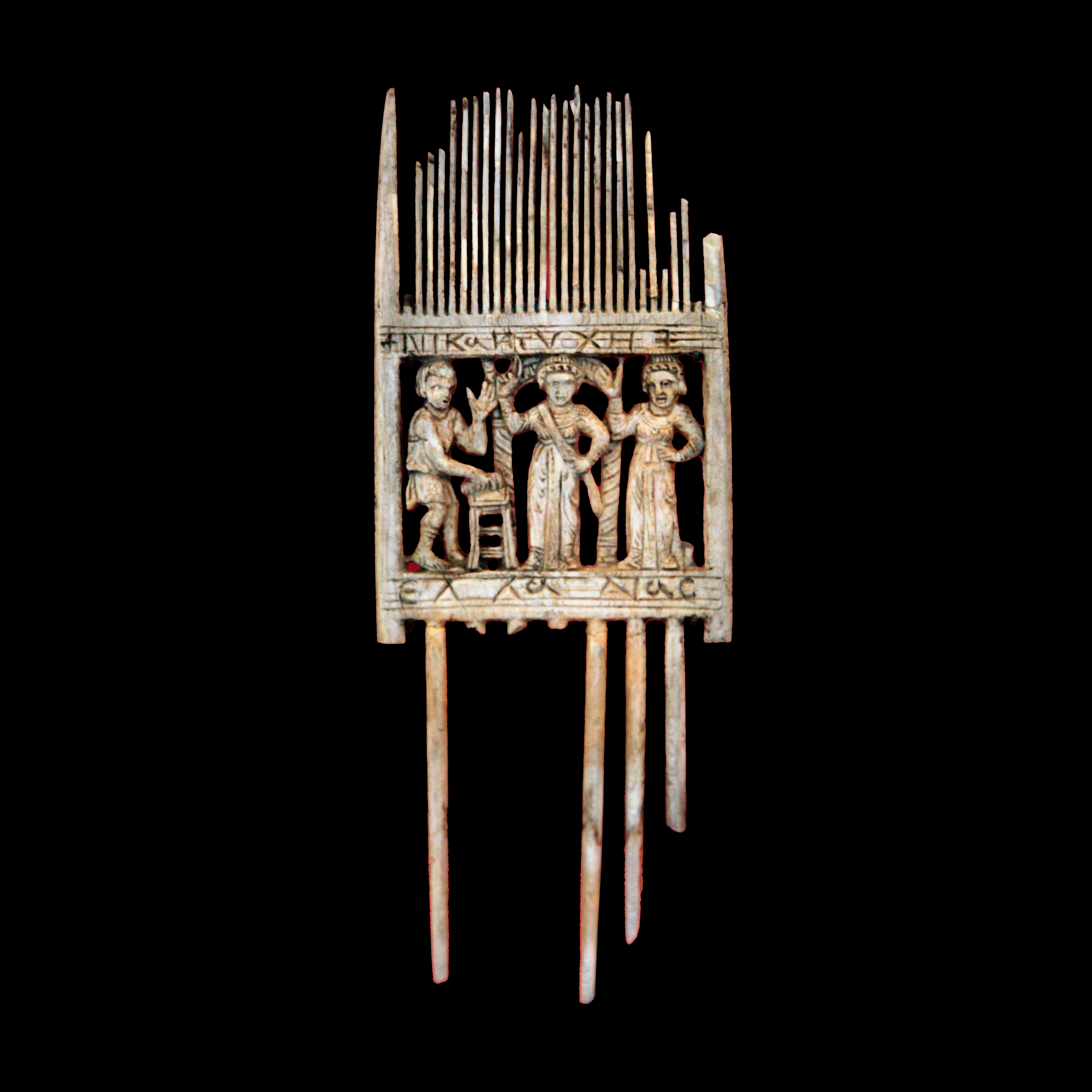
A 5th-century comb from Antinoöpolis which may have belonged to Helladia, inscribed with "Long live Helladia's fortune and the Blues! Amen!"

Helladia (5th-century) was an Ancient Roman stage artist - an actress and dancer.

She is mentioned as a famous stage actor within pantomime in several epigrams which praised her skill. She appears to have been well known by her contemporaries. One of her most celebrated roles were the role of the male hero Hector of the Trojan War, which illustrates that women could play male parts on stage in antiquity.

She was possibly the same Helladia who was depicted on an ivory comb which is kept at the Louvre.
