= Michael Whitby =

British ancient historian (born 1952)

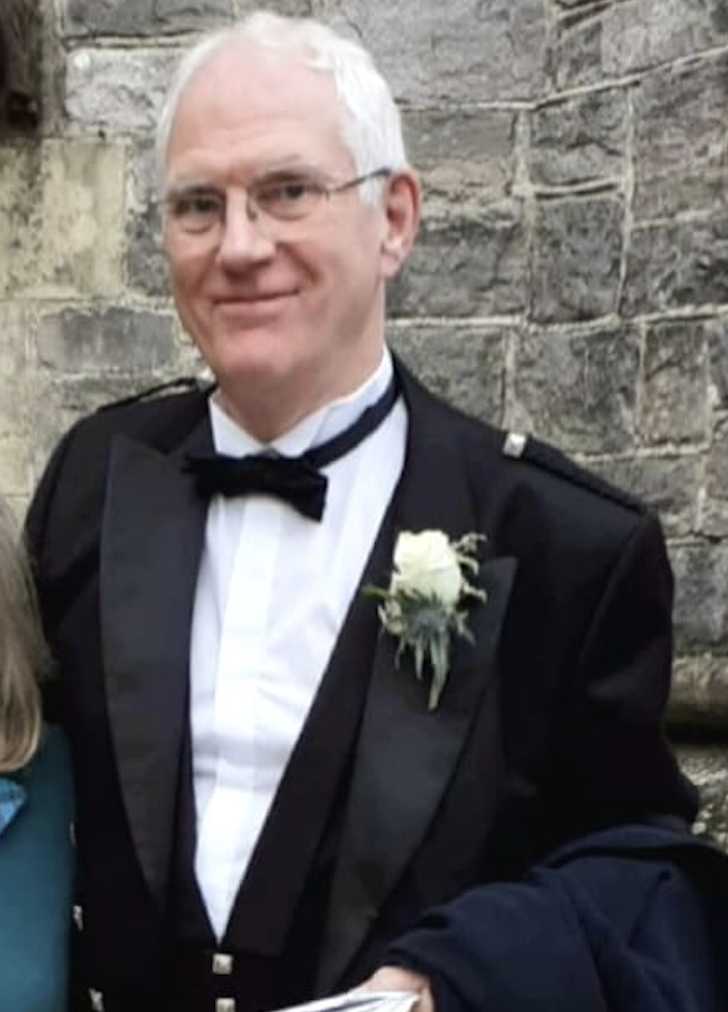
- Whitby in 2025
- Born: Lionel Michael Whitby; 8 February 1952; Cambridge, England
- Education: Corpus Christi College, Oxford
- Occupation: Historian
- Employers: Merton College, Oxford; University of St Andrews; University of Warwick; University of Birmingham
- Known for: Late Roman history and Byzantine studies

Lionel Michael Whitby (born February 1952) is a British ancient historian of Late Antiquity. He specialises in late Roman and early Byzantine history and historiography. He is now retired and lives in St Andrews.

== Early life ==
Whitby was born in February 1952, to Gordon Whitby, a physician and biochemist and Joan (née Sanderson), winner of the geology medal at St Andrews and then doctoral student in geology at Cambridge. He read Literae Humaniores at Corpus Christi College, University of Oxford. He then spent three years working as a civil servant in the Scottish Office. He returned to Oxford to conduct postgraduate study in Byzantine history under the supervision of James Howard-Johnston. He completed his Doctor of Philosophy (DPhil) degree in 1981 with a doctoral thesis titled "The Historiae of Theophylact Simocatta".

== Academic career ==
Whitby held a junior research fellowship at Merton College, Oxford. In 1987, he joined the Ancient History department at the University of St Andrews. He became head of department in 1993 and received a personal chair in 1995 as Professor of Ancient History.

He was Professor of Classics and Ancient History at the University of Warwick, having joined the Department of Classics and Ancient History in 1996. He served as Chair of the Faculty of Arts (2001–3) and then pro-vice-chancellor for 'Teaching, Learning and Quality' (2003–9), International Relations (2007–10) , and 'Academic Planning and Resources' (2009–10).

In September 2010 he moved to the University of Birmingham as Pro-Vice-Chancellor and Head of the College of Arts and Law (2010–19), years when improvements in quality and reputation led to significant increases in investment from the university. After retirement in 2019 he returned to academic research after a long intermission caused by university administrative duties and has focused on the production of translations, with full annotation and comprehensive introductions, of a sequence of important texts from Late Antiquity.

== Honours ==
In 2007, Whitby was awarded a Doctor of Letters (DLitt) honorary degree by the University of Warwick. He received one of the 2009 Distinguished Book Awards from the Society for Military History for The Cambridge History of Greek and Roman Warfare. In 2026 he was awarded an Honorary Professorship in the School of Classics at University of St Andrews.

== Personal life ==
Whitby is married to Lynne (née Ireland) and has three sons, Max, Brodie, and Archie.

== Major Works ==
- The History of Theophylact Simocatta: an English translation with introduction and notes (1986), with Mary Whitby.
- The Emperor Maurice and his Historian: Theophylact Simocatta on Persian and Balkan Warfare (1988).
- Chronicon Paschale 284–628 AD (1989), with Mary Whitby.
- The Ecclesiastical History of Evagrius Scholasticus, an English translation with introduction and notes (TTH, Liverpool: Liverpool University Press, 2000).
- Theodore Syncellus, The Homilies ‘On the Robe’ and ‘On the Siege’, translated with introduction and notes (TTH. Liverpool: Liverpool University Press, 2024).
- The Life of Theodore of Sykeon, with the Encomium of Nicholas the Sacristan, translated with Introduction and Notes (Liverpool: Liverpool University Press, 2024), with Richard Price.
- The Life of Porphyry of Gaza by Mark the Deacon, with translation of the Georgian life, translated with Introduction and Notes (Liverpool: Liverpool University Press, 2025), with Jeff Childers and Claudia Rapp.
- Documents of the Early Arian Controversy and the Council of Nicaea, translated with Introduction and Notes (2025), With Richard Price and David M. Gwynn.
- Monastic Saints of Constantinople 350-500. The Lives of Isaac, Hypatius, Marcellus the Sleepless, Auxentius, Domnica, and John the Calybite, translated with Introduction and Notes (2026).

== Edited Works ==
- Homo Viator: Classical Essays for John Bramble (1987), with Philip Hardie and Mary Whitby.
- The Cambridge Ancient History XIV; AD 425–600 (2000), co-editor with Averil Cameron and Bryan Ward-Perkins
- Sparta. An annotated selection of readings (2001).
- The Cambridge History of Ancient Warfare (2005), co-editor with Philip Sabin and Hans van Wees.
- G.E.M. de Ste. Croix, Christian Persecution, Martyrdom and Orthodoxy (2006) co-editor with Joseph Streeter.
- The Encyclopedia of Ancient Battles (2017), with Harry Sidebottom.

== Popular Works ==
- Rome at War AD 293–696 (2002).
- How to Win on the Battlefield. The 25 Key Tactics of All Time (2010).
- The Wars of Justinian (2022).
