= Mary Whitby =

Classicist; (born 1951)

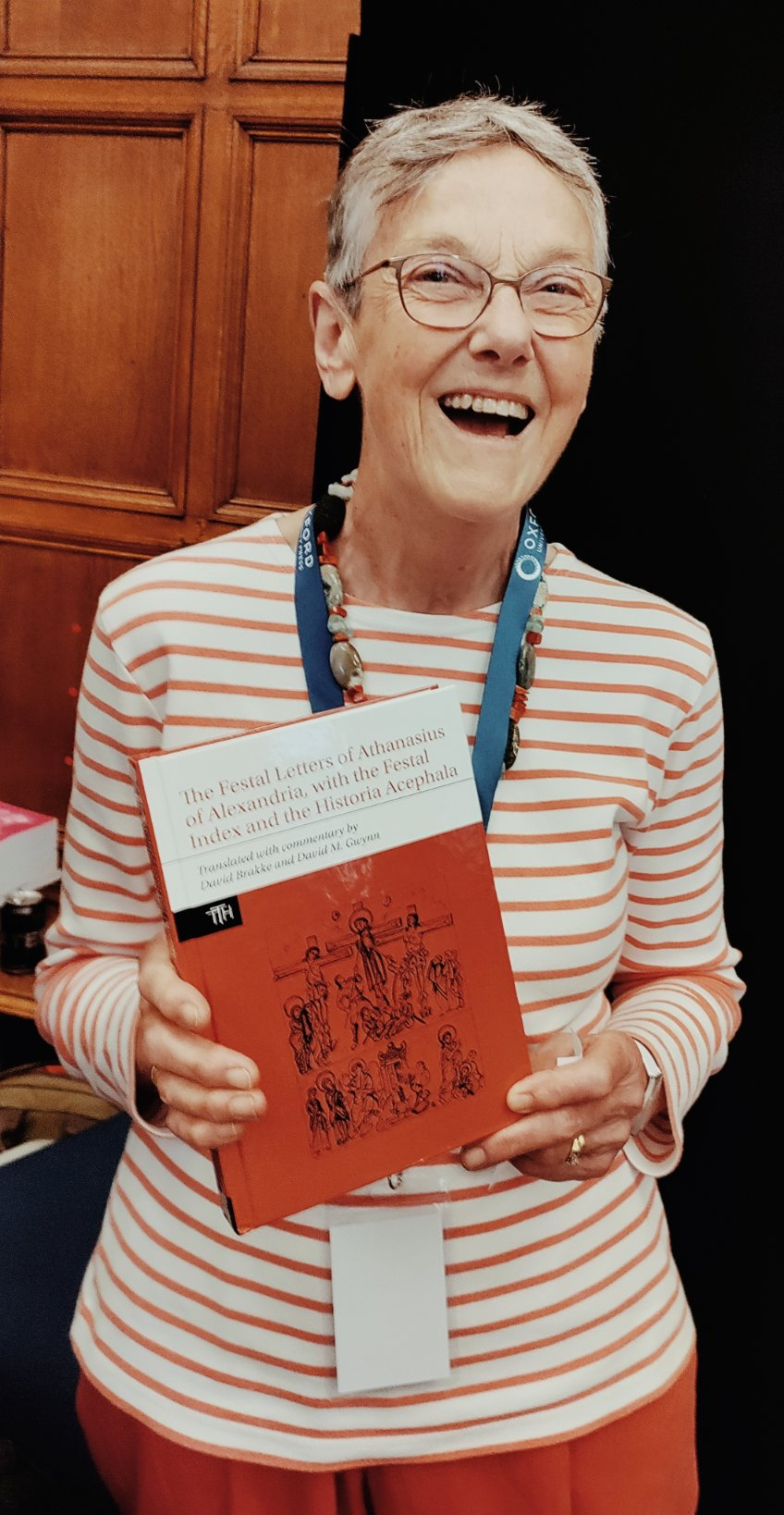
Mary Whitby, University of Oxford, 2024

Mary Whitby is a late-antique philologist at the University of Oxford. She teaches Greek language at Merton College, Oxford.

== Education ==
Whitby received her PhD from the University of Edinburgh in 1982. Her doctoral thesis was A Linguistic and Exegetical Commentary on the Rhetorical Prologue and Epilogue Framing Paul the Silentiary's Ekphrasis of S. Sophia.

== Research and career ==
Whitby is a general editor, with Phil Booth and Mark Humphries, of the book series, Translated Texts for Historians, published by Liverpool University Press. The series publishes translations of texts from Latin, Greek, Syriac and other eastern languages from the period AD 300–800 into English. She has published extensively on Byzantine Greek literature, especially the poet Nonnus, Eudocia's Homeric Centos, and George of Pisidia.

== Bibliography ==
- 'The Occasion of Paul the Silentiary's Ekphrasis of S. Sophia', Classical Quarterly, Band 35, 1985, S. 215–228
- (with Michael Whitby) Chronicon Paschale 284–628 AD, Translated Texts for Historians, Liverpool University Press, 1989
- 'From Moschus to Nonnus: the Evolution of the Nonnian Style', Studies in the Dionysiaca of Nonnus, Cambridge Philological Society Supplementary Volume 17, ed. by Neil Hopkinson (Cambridge 1994) 99–155
- 'The Devil in Disguise: the End of George of Pisidia's Hexaemeron Reconsidered', Journal of Hellenic Studies, Band 115, 1995, 116–131
- (ed.) The Propaganda of Power: The Role of Panegyric in Late Antiquity, Leiden: Brill, 1998
- 'Procopius’ Buildings, Book 1: a Panegyrical Perspective', Antiquité Tardive, Band 8, 2000, 45–57
- (with Michael Whitby) The History of Theophylact Simocatta, Oxford 1986, 2005
- 'The St Polyeuktos Epigram (AP 1.10): a Literary Perspective', Greek Literature in Late Antiquity: Dynamism, Didacticism, Classicism, Ashgate, 2006, 159–87
- Byzantine and Crusaders in Non-Greek Sources, 1025–1204, Oxford 2006
- 'The Biblical Past in John Malalas and the Paschal Chronicle', From Rome to Constantinople: Studies in Honour of Averil Cameron, ed. by H. Amirav, B. ter Haar Romeny, Leiden, 2007, 279–302
- 'The Cynegetica attributed to ps.-Oppian', Severan Culture, J. Elsner, S. Harrison, S. Swain (Cambridge 2007) 125–134
- 'The Bible Hellenized: “Eudocia’s” Homeric Centos and Nonnus’ St John Paraphrase', Texts and Culture in Late Antiquity: Inheritance, Authority and Change, ed. by David Scourfield (Classical Press of Wales, 2007) 193–229
- (with Richard Price) Chalcedon in Context: Church Councils 400–700, Translated Texts for Historians, Liverpool University Press 2009
