= Cordes =

Cordes may refer to:

== Places ==
- Cordes (river), river of ancient Syria (now in Turkey)
- Cordes, Arizona, United States
- Cordes, Wallonia, in Frasnes-lez-Anvaing, Belgium
- Cordes-sur-Ciel, Tarn, France
- Cordes-Tolosannes in the Tarn-et-Garonne department in the Occitanie region in southern France

== People ==
- Alexandra Cordes (1935–1986), German writer
- Attrell Cordes (1970–2016), American rapper and musician
- Baltazar de Cordes (d. 1601), Dutch corsair
- Burkhard Cordes (born 1939), Brazilian sailor
- Charlott Cordes (born 1988), German model
- Colin Cordes, New Zealand rower
- Frederick Cordes (born 1986), German politician
- Gloria Cordes (1931–2018), American baseball player
- Heinz Otto Cordes (1925–2018), German-American mathematician
- Jill Cordes (born 1969), American television personality
- John Cordes (1890–1966), American police detective
- Kevin Cordes (born 1993), American swimmer
- Manfred Cordes (born 1953), German conductor
- Marcel Cordes (1920–1992), German baritone
- Nancy Cordes (born 1974), American journalist
- Otto Cordes (1905–1970), German water polo player
- Paul Josef Cordes (1934–2024), German Catholic cardinal
- Tim Cordes, American physician
- Ulrich Cordes (born 1980), German tenor

== See also ==
- Coordes, people with this surname
