= Ararat (name) =

Ararat is a name with Armenian origin. It mainly drives from Mt. Ararat, located in Eastern Turkey, but historically part of ancient Armenia. Notable people with the name include:

== Given name ==
- Ararat Harutyunyan (born 1975), Armenian footballer
- Ararat Mirzoyan (born 1979), Armenian politician

== Surname ==
- Melsa Ararat, Turkish activist scholar and professor of corporate governance
- Mem Ararat (born 1981), Kurdish singer, songwriter, and composer from Turkey

== See also ==
- Ararat (disambiguation)
