= Dara, Artuklu =

Village in Mardin Province, Turkey

Dara
- Neighbourhood
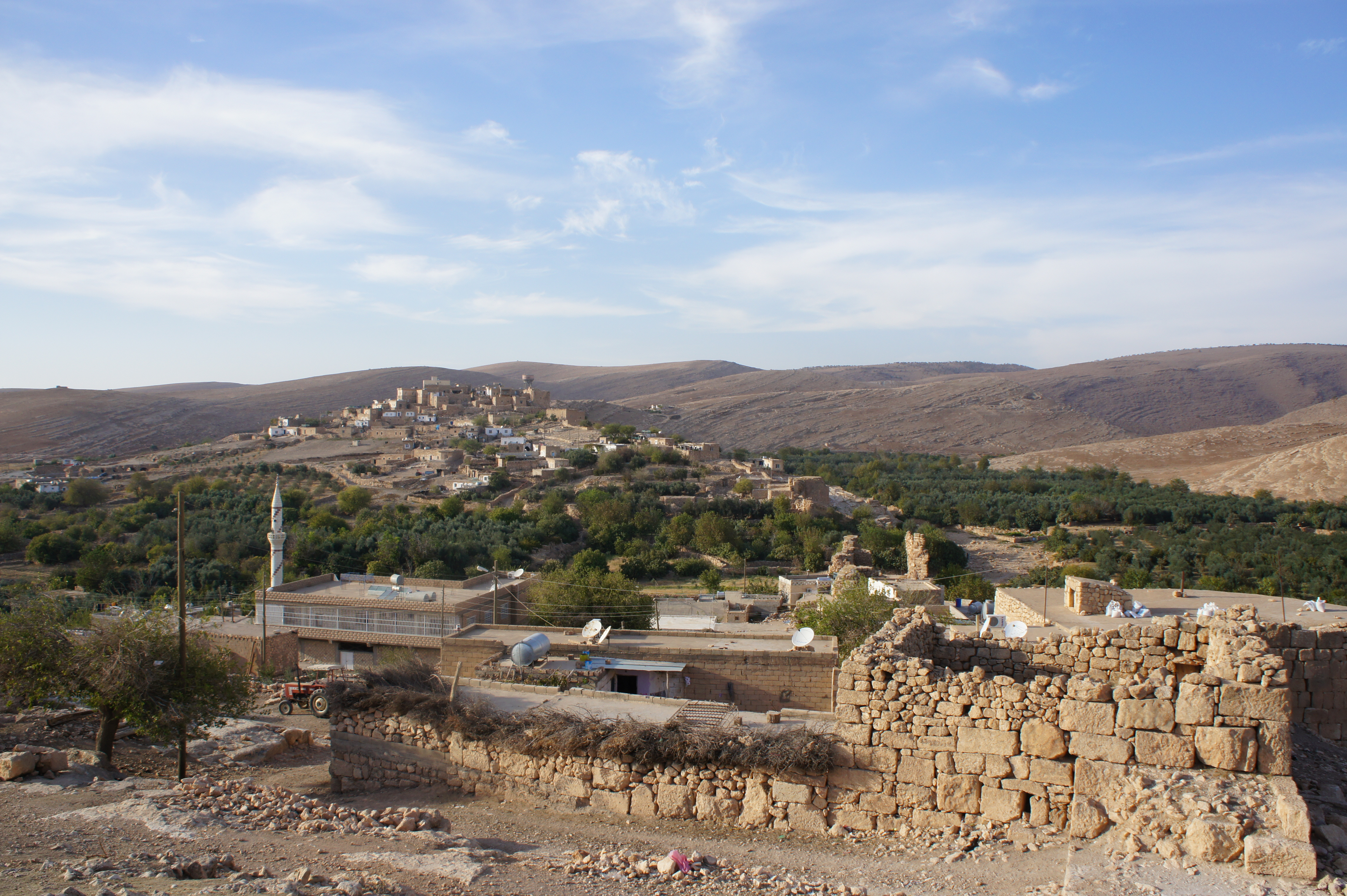

- Location within Turkey
- Coordinates: 37.178°N 40.953°E
- Country: Turkey
- Province: Mardin
- District: Artuklu
- Population (2021): 1,029
- Time zone: UTC+3 (TRT)

Dara, formerly Oğuz, (Kurdish: Dara, Darê) is a neighbourhood in the municipality and district of Artuklu, Mardin Province in Turkey. The village is populated by Kurds and had a population of 1,029 in 2021.

== History ==
The village was populated by Armenians until the Armenian genocide in 1915. Kurds from Bayrakli, Derik would subsequently settle in the village and have since then been intertwined with the surrounding Dakoran tribe.

== See also ==
- Battle of Dara (530 CE)
- Dara (Mesopotamia)
- Dara Dam – Roman arch dam
