= Düztaş =

Düztaş (literally: flat stone) is a Turkish word. It may refer to:

== People ==
- Şeyma Düztaş (born 2002); Turkish female boxer

== Place ==
- Düztaş, Derik, a neighborhood of Derik district in Mardin, southeastern Turkey
