= Acacius (son of Archelaus) =

Byzantine official

Acacius, son of Archelaus (Greek: Ἀκάκιος τοῦ Ἀρχελάου) was a Byzantine official, mentioned as a representative of emperor Justin II (r. 565–578) in 573. He is known for causing a military disaster in a siege of Nisibis (573), early in the Roman–Persian War of 572–591.

== Siege of Nisibis ==
=== John of Epiphania ===
Acacius is first mentioned by name in the work of John of Epiphania. He was reportedly sent by Justin II to dismiss Marcian, the magister militum per Orientem, from office. Acacius dutifully did so, preventing Marcian from concluding the siege of Nisibis. The leaderless Byzantine troops retreated. After the winter season, Marcian gathered together his forces again and set out from Dara meeting with the barbarians in front of the city of Nisibis led by Varaman, who was in command of the companies stationed them. A fierce battle followed in which the Romans turned the barbarians to flight vigorously near the Persian place called Sarmathon, bringing down many of them. Then making an attempt at the fortress of Thebython where they spent ten days. Unable to seize it, they returned to the city of Dara while it was still spring and again invaded enemy land planning to besiege Nisibis with the approval of the emperor Justin."

"While they were encamped near the city, King Chosroës set out from Babylon with an army of Medians crossing the Tigris River and passing over empty land, as the Roman had not heard of the king‘s movements, and came upon the Persian fortress of Amvaron (it is five days distant from the city of Circesion), where he dispatched Adaarman, as the general was called, to cross the Euphrates River there and plunder Roman territory with thousands of his own Medians and nomadic barbarians. At the same time, he urged Avorras on to the Romans besieging Nisibis. When Adaarman reached the city of Circesion, he crossed the Euphrates and began to forage Roman lands without any restraint. For due to the previous peace and quiet that they had enjoyed during the reign of Justinian, their war time preparation had receded and their virility completely vanished. As no one dared to come to blows with the barbarians, Adaarman was able to come as far as the city of Antioch ravaging the sites and fields near the city and then advancing on Coele Syria. He made camp not far from the great city of Apamea, to whose citizens’ embassies he promised to enter the city and leave it unharmed, but then actually entering it where the Persians seized their possessions, enslaved its inhabitants, and put the entire city to the flame then returning in all haste to their own land. As a result of these actions, the emperor Justin dispatched Acacius (the Romans are accustomed to add the name of Archelaus) removing Marcian, who was still besieging Nisibis, from office because he had doubts about his loyalty, as the city had not yet been taken control of. ... As the Romans were retreating."

=== John of Ephesus ===
John of Ephesus gives a similar account, but gives more attention to the contact of Acacius and the reactions of the soldiers: "The illustrious Patrician Marcian, a relative of king Justin, was sent by him to command one of the Roman armies in the east; and being warmly zealous for the polity of the Christians, he assembled an army, and laid siege to Nisibis, the frontier town and bulwark of Mesopotamia, and then in possession of the Persians. And having strongly invested it, and constructed round it a palisade, he commenced, with the aid of the skilful mechanicians whom he had brought with him, to erect more scientific works, consisting of lofty towers and strong covered approaches. And the city began to be distressed, and both its inhabitants and the Persian garrison despaired of their lives when they saw it so hard pressed by the Romans. And as those inside were in alarm, so those outside were making their preparations to assault the city and plunder it; but just as they were ready to storm it, a violent tempered man arrived, named Acacius Archelaus, sent for no just reason by king Justin to deprive Marcian of his command, and cut his girdle and send him away from the cast."

And immediately that he came, he [Acacius] showed his orders, just at the time when Marcian and his army were fighting against Nisibis, and expecting to assault it the next day, and win the city; and all were in astonishment, and their hands were weakened. And the illustrious Marcian, who had been assiduously making his preparations, and was upon the point of capturing Nisibis, on hearing the orders, said to Acacius, 'You see how great labour we have taken for the purpose of capturing this city; and now, wait a little, and grant us a delay of two days only, and then do what you have been commanded; for the king has a right that what he orders should be done.' But he [Acacius] was angry with him [Marcianus], and insulted him, and in hot wrath laid hands upon him in the presence of all his officers, and pulled him about, and threw him down, and cut his girdle, scoffing at him, and even, as was said, he struck him on the cheek. And the whole army was indignant, and their hands weakened, and execrating the wickedness which had been done before their eyes, they lowered their standard, and turned it upside down. And thereupon the whole army fled, and left the city far behind them, and loud was their grief and lamentation at what had happened to their commander; for he was a good man and a believer: and besides, at the very time when they were expecting to enter and take the city, they had shown their backs when there was no enemy who pursued them, and had become the laughter and scorn of their foes."

"And when the Persian army which garrisoned the city saw the breaking up and sadden retreat of the Romans, and Marcian's standard overthrown, they were astonished, and encouraged one another, and armed and pursued after them, and fell upon a body of infantry which remained behind, and defeated and slew most of them, and so returned to the city, laughing and mocking at what had happened to the Romans of their own selves. Forthwith, too, they wrote and informed their king of all these things, saying, 'Come, immediately, and let us cross over into the Roman territory; for our noble gods, the sun and fire, have made them, by the commandment of their king, fall upon one another; and they have dismissed Marcian with scorn, and have all fled and gone away from our city.'"

=== Evagrius Scholasticus ===
Evagrius Scholasticus gives his own take on the matter: placing the blame on Justin himself, on Marcianus and on Acacius : "The emperor sends out his kinsman Marcian, as commander of the forces of the East, without, however, sufficiently supplying him with troops, or the other material of war. He occupies Mesopotamia, at the imminent risk of utter ruin, followed by very few troops, and these imperfectly armed, and by a few rustic labourers and herdsmen, whom he had pressed into his service from among the provincials. After gaining the advantage in some skirmishes near Nisibis with the Persians, who were themselves not yet completely prepared, he sits down before that city, though the enemy did not think it necessary to close the gates, and insolently jeered the Roman troops. Besides many other prodigies presaging the approaching calamities, I also saw, at the beginning of the war, a newly born calf with two heads."

"Chosroes, when his preparations for war were completed, having accompanied Adaarmanes for some distance, sent him across the Euphrates from his own bank of the river into the Roman territory, by Circesium, a city most important to the Romans, situated at the limit of the empire, and rendered strong not only by its walls, which are carried to an immense height, but by the rivers Euphrates and Aboras, which, as it were, insulate the place. Chosroes himself, having crossed the Tigris with his own division of the army, advanced upon Nisibis. Of these operations the Romans were for a long time ignorant, so far that Justin, relying on a rumour to the effect that Chosroes was either dead or approaching his last breath, was indignant at the tardiness of the siege of Nisibis, and sent persons for the purpose of stimulating the efforts of Marcian, and bringing to him the keys of the gates as quickly as possible. Information, however, that the siege was making no progress, but that the commander was bringing great discredit upon himself by attempting impossibilities in the case of so important a city with so contemptible a force, is conveyed in the first instance to Gregory, bishop of Theopolis."

"For the bishop of Nisibis, being strongly attached to Gregory, as having received munificent presents from him, and especially being indignant at the insolence which the Persians were continually displaying towards the Christians, and desirous that his city should be subject to the Roman power, supplied information to Gregory of all things that were going on in the enemy's territory, at each several juncture. This the latter immediately forwarded to Justin, informing him as quickly as possible of the advance of Chosroes: but he, being immersed in his habitual pleasures, paid no regard to the letters of Gregory; nor was he indeed inclined to believe them, indulging rather the thoughts suggested by his wishes: for the ordinary mark of dissolute persons is a meanness of spirit combined with confidence with regard to results; as well as incredulity, if any thing occurs which runs counter to their desires. Accordingly he writes to Gregory, altogether repudiating the information as being utterly false, and, even supposing it were true, saying that the Persians would not come up before the siege was concluded, and that, if they did, they would be beaten off with loss. He further sends Acacius, a wicked and insolent man, to Marcian with orders to supersede him in the command, even supposing he had already set one foot within the town. This command he strictly executed, carrying out the emperor's orders without any regard to the public good: for, on his arrival at the camp, he deprives Marcian of his command while on the enemy's territory, and without informing the army of the transaction. The various officers, on learning at the break of the next clay that their commander was superseded, no longer appeared at the head of their troops, but stole away in various directions, and thus raised that ridiculous siege."

=== Later accounts ===
Theophylact Simocatta, Theophanes the Confessor, Michael the Syrian, the Chronicle of 1234, Bar-Hebraeus, and Nikephoros Kallistos Xanthopoulos give derivative accounts. Theophanes, Nikephoros, the Chronicle and Bar-Hebraeus conclude that Acacius replaced Marcianus as magister militum per Orientem. While this could be a valid interpretation of the primary sources, it contradicts Theophanes of Byzantium. The latter has Marcianus succeeded by Theodore Tzirus. Michael Whitby simply observes: "It is unclear whether Acacius Archelaus was sent out to replace Marcian, or merely to announce his replacement by Theodore Tzirus, son of Justinian, whom Theophanes Byzantinus names as the new general."

The rank of Acacius is never clarified in primary sources. The Chronicle of 1234 is the only source to call him a tribune. The Prosopography of the Later Roman Empire considers it likely that Acacius was one of the scribones, often employed on important missions.

== Sources ==
- Kennedy, Scott; Müller, Carl; John of Epiphania (2008), History of the submission of Chosroës the Younger to Maurice the Roman Emperor, online translation, public domain
- Martindale, John R.; Jones, A.H.M.; Morris, John (1992), The Prosopography of the Later Roman Empire, Volume III: AD 527–641, Cambridge University Press, ISBN 0-521-20160-8
- Smith, R.Payne (1860), John of Ephesus, Ecclesiastical History, Part 3, online translation, public domain
- Walford, E (1846), Evagrius Scholasticus, Ecclesiastical History, online translation, public domain
- Whitby, Michael (1998), The Emperor Maurice and his Historian – Theophylact Simocatta on Persian and Balkan Warfare, Oxford University Press, ISBN 0-19-822945-3
