= Goranov =

Goranov (masculine, Bulgarian: Горанов) or Goranova (Bulgarian: Горанова) is a Bulgarian surname. Notable people with the surname include:

- Aleksandar Goranov (born 1988), Bulgarian footballer
- Ivan Goranov (born 1992), Bulgarian footballer
- Ivet Goranova (born 2000), Bulgarian karateka
- Kamen Goranov (born 1948), Bulgarian sport wrestler
- Maria Goranova, American academic
- Milcho Goranov (1928–2008), Bulgarian footballer
- Orlin Goranov (born 1957), Bulgarian musician
- Plamen Goranov (1976–2013), Bulgarian photographer and activist
- Rumen Goranov (born 1984), Bulgarian footballer
- Rumyancho Goranov (born 1950), Bulgarian footballer
- Vladislav Goranov (born 1977), Bulgarian politician
