= Melsa Ararat =

Turkish academic

- Known for: Corporate governance, Business ethics, Gender diversity, Sustainability
- Scientific career
- Institutions: Sabancı University, University of Groningen
- Website: sbs.sabanciuniv.edu/en/melsa-ararat

Melsa Ararat is a Turkish activist scholar and professor of corporate governance. She is the founder and former director of Corporate Governance Forum of Turkey (CGFT) at Sabancı University and the founding director of CDP Turkey. She is the founder and Chair of 30% Club Turkey campaign and the founding director of Business Against Domestic Violence Project (BADV).

Ararat was elected to the board of International Corporate Governance Network (ICGN) in 2015 for a 6-year term, and to the board of United Nations Global Compact Turkey Network in 2019 for a 3-year term. She has been a visiting professor at the Faculty of Business and Economics in University of Groningen since 2015.

Her academic work focuses on corporate governance in emerging markets, gender diversity in corporate boards, business ethics and strategic management.

== Education ==
Ararat holds a BSc degree in chemical engineering, a MSc degree in thermodynamics and Phd in management and strategy.

== Career and research ==
Following an international career in board positions and senior management in Turkey, the Benelux, Singapore and Japan within Philips Group, Ararat joined academia in 2002 as a professor of Practice and the Founding Director of Corporate Governance Forum of Turkey (CGFT) at Sabancı University. She supported Capital Markets Board of Turkey in developing its Corporate Governance Principles which was published in 2003. Ararat worked as an advisor to S&P’s Governance Services between 2004 and 2008. She became an associate professor of Business Ethics in 2011 and the Principal Researcher in 2017 at Sabanci University from which she retired in 2021.

She coordinated Emerging Markets Corporate Governance Research Network of IFC from 2009 to 2017. She founded CDP’s Turkey operation in 2009, Business Against Domestic Violence Project in 2014 together with UNFPA, Independent Women Directors Platform in 2013 and 30% Club Turkey Chapter in 2017.

She was elected as a governor of International Corporate Governance Network (ICGN) in 2015 and served as a board liaison for Business Ethics and Systemic Risk Committee. She coordinated the public and private sector organizations in developing a roadmap to promote gender diversity in corporate boards between 2019 and 2021.

She also contributed to the launch of Borsa Istanbul's Sustainability Index in 2013 and Climate Index in 2021.

=== Selected publications ===
- Ararat, Melsa; Yurtoglu, B. Burcin (2021). "Female directors, board committees, and firm performance: Time-series evidence from Turkey". Emerging Markets Review. 48 100768. doi:10.1016/j.ememar.2020.100768.
- Ararat, Melsa, ed. (2020). Business Against Intimate Partner Violence. Accounting, Finance, Sustainability, Governance & Fraud: Theory and Application. Springer Nature. doi:10.1007/978-981-32-9652-7. ISBN 978-981-32-9651-0.
- Ararat, Melsa; Colpan, Asli M.; Matten, Dirk (2018). "Business Groups and Corporate Responsibility for the Public Good". Journal of Business Ethics. 153 (4): 911–929. doi:10.1007/s10551-018-3920-4.
- Ararat, Melsa; Black, Bernard S; Yurtoğlu, Burçin B. (March 2017). "The effect of corporate governance on firm value and profitability: time-series evidence from Turkey". Emerging Markets Review. 30: 113–132. doi:10.1016/j.ememar.2016.10.001.
- Ararat, Melsa; Uğur, Mehmet (2003). "Corporate governance in Turkey: an overview and some policy recommendations". Corporate Governance. 3 (1): 58–75. doi:10.1108/14720700310459863.
- Ararat, Melsa; Aksu, Mine Hatice; Tansel Çetin, Ayşe (2015). "How board diversity affects firm performance in emerging markets: evidence on channels in controlled firms". Corporate Governance. 23 (2): 83–103. doi:10.1111/corg.12103.
