= Yazıcık =

Yazıcık may refer to the following settlements in Turkey:

- Yazıcık, Derik, a neighbourhood in Derik, Mardin Province
- Yazıcık, Devrek, a village in Zonguldak Province
- Yazıcık, Niksar, a town in Tokat Province
- Yazıcık, Pozantı, a neighbourhood in Adana Province
