= Karahan =

Karahan is a Turkish word that may refer to:

== States ==
- Karakhanids, a medieval Turkic dynasty in Central Asia

== People ==
- Enwer Karahan (born 1962), Kurdish writer
- Fatih Karahan (born 1982), Turkish economist and current Governor of the Central Bank of the Republic of Turkey
- Hakan Karahan (born 1960), Turkish writer and songwriter
- Pelin Karahan (born 1984), Turkish actress

== Places ==
- Karahan, Aladağ, a village in Aladağ district of Adana Province, Turkey
- Karahan, Çukurova, a village in Seyhan district of Adana Province, Turkey
- Karahan, İspir
- Karahan Tepe, a Neolithic archeological site in Turkey
