= Yukarımezraa, Derik =

Village in Mardin Province, Turkey

Yukarımezraa
- Neighbourhood
- Location in Turkey
- Coordinates: 37.424°N 40.245°E
- Country: Turkey
- Province: Mardin
- District: Derik
- Population (2021): 245
- Time zone: UTC+3 (TRT)

Yukarımezraa (Kurdish: Mezra Suravêrkê) is a neighbourhood in the municipality and district of Derik, Mardin Province in Turkey. The village is populated by Kurds of the Metînan tribe and had a population of 245 in 2021.
