= Karaburun, Derik =

Village in Mardin Province, Turkey

Karaburun
- Neighbourhood
- Location in Turkey
- Coordinates: 37.230°N 40.386°E
- Country: Turkey
- Province: Mardin
- District: Derik
- Population (2021): 146
- Time zone: UTC+3 (TRT)

Karaburun (Kurdish: Xirbêreş) is a neighbourhood in the municipality and district of Derik, Mardin Province in Turkey. The village is populated by Kurds of the Sefan tribe and had a population of 146 in 2021.
