= Ortaca, Derik =

Village in Mardin Province, Turkey

Ortaca
- Neighbourhood
- Location in Turkey
- Coordinates: 37.211°N 40.250°E
- Country: Turkey
- Province: Mardin
- District: Derik
- Population (2021): 100
- Time zone: UTC+3 (TRT)

Ortaca (Kurdish: Reqaqî) is a neighbourhood in the municipality and district of Derik, Mardin Province in Turkey. The village had a population of 100 in 2021.
