= Balova, Derik =

Village in Mardin Province, Turkey

Balova
- Neighbourhood
- Location in Turkey
- Coordinates: 37.240°N 40.231°E
- Country: Turkey
- Province: Mardin
- District: Derik
- Population (2021): 335
- Time zone: UTC+3 (TRT)

Balova (Kurdish: Balfis) is a neighbourhood in the municipality and district of Derik, Mardin Province in Turkey. The village had a population of 335 in 2021.
