= Alanlı, Derik =

Village in Mardin Province, Turkey

Alanlı
- Neighbourhood
- Location in Turkey
- Coordinates: 37.194°N 40.179°E
- Country: Turkey
- Province: Mardin
- District: Derik
- Population (2021): 738
- Time zone: UTC+3 (TRT)

Alanlı (Kurdish: Enterî) is a neighbourhood in the municipality and district of Derik, Mardin Province in Turkey. The village had a population of 738 in 2021.
