= Çadırlı, Derik =

Village in Mardin Province, Turkey

Çadırlı
- Neighbourhood
- Location in Turkey
- Coordinates: 37.170°N 40.294°E
- Country: Turkey
- Province: Mardin
- District: Derik
- Population (2021): 984
- Time zone: UTC+3 (TRT)

Çadırlı (Kurdish: Şabana) is a neighbourhood in the municipality and district of Derik, Mardin Province in Turkey. The village had a population of 984 in 2021.
