= Adak, Derik =

Village in Mardin Province, Turkey

Adak
- Neighbourhood
- Location in Turkey
- Coordinates: 37.285°N 40.069°E
- Country: Turkey
- Province: Mardin
- District: Derik
- Population (2021): 455
- Time zone: UTC+3 (TRT)

Adak (Kurdish: Simaqî) is a neighbourhood in the municipality and district of Derik, Mardin Province in Turkey. The village is populated by Kurds of the Mahmûdî tribe and had a population of 455 in 2021.
