= Atlı, Derik =

Village in Mardin Province, Turkey

Atlı
- Neighbourhood
- Location in Turkey
- Coordinates: 37.190°N 40.142°E
- Country: Turkey
- Province: Mardin
- District: Derik
- Population (2021): 1,746
- Time zone: UTC+3 (TRT)

Atlı (Kurdish: Qesra Qenco) is a neighbourhood in the municipality and district of Derik, Mardin Province in Turkey. The village is populated by Kurds from the Sorkan tribe and had a population of 1,746 in 2021.

== Notable people ==
- Ahmet Türk
