= Söğütözü, Derik =

Village in Mardin Province, Turkey

Söğütözü
- Neighbourhood
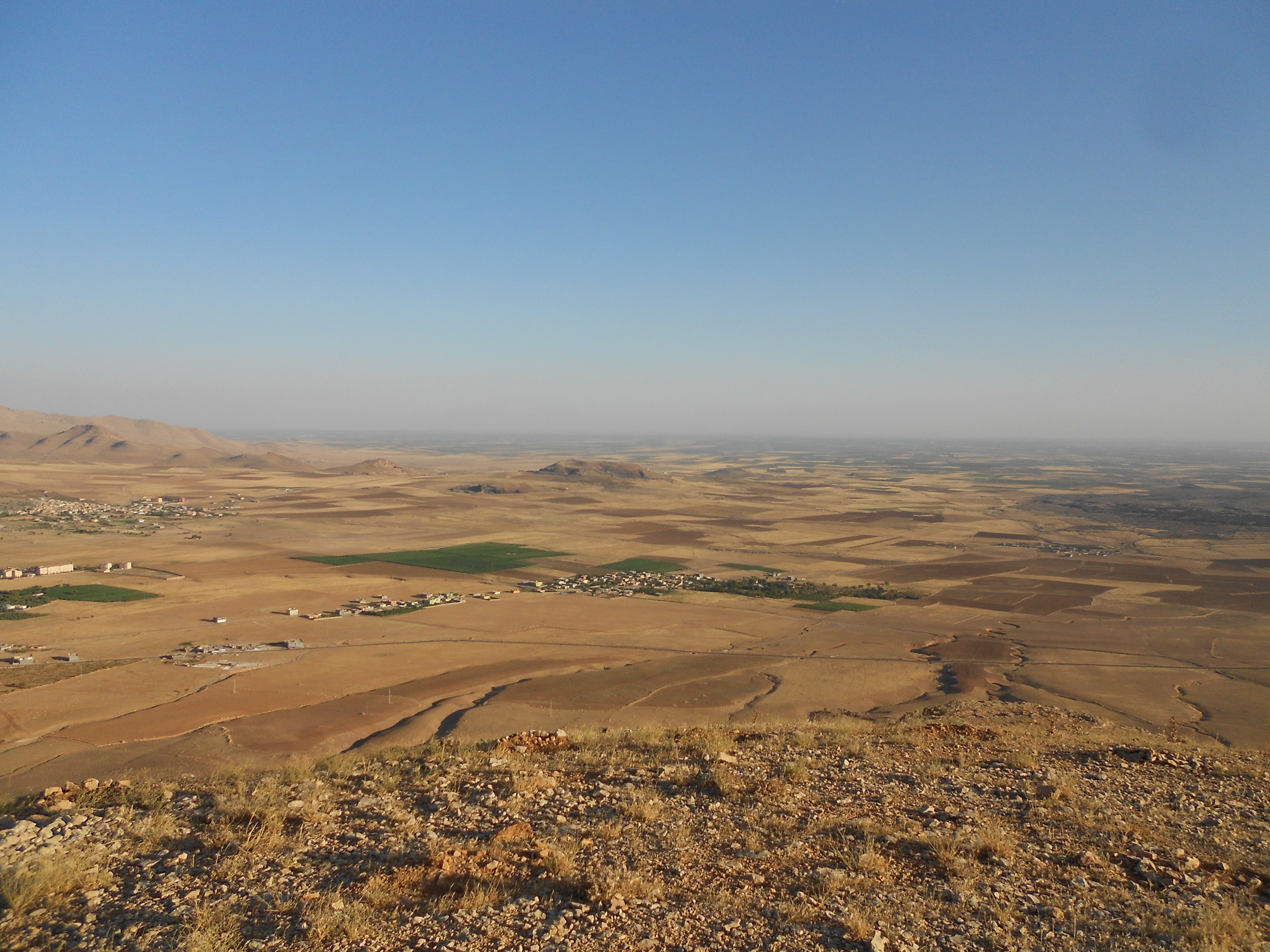

- Location within Turkey
- Coordinates: 37.342°N 40.248°E
- Country: Turkey
- Province: Mardin
- District: Derik
- Population (2021): 1,314
- Time zone: UTC+3 (TRT)

Söğütözü (Kurdish: Qetaro) is a neighbourhood in the municipality and district of Derik, Mardin Province in Turkey. The village had a population of 1,314 in 2021.
