= Çayköy, Derik =

Village in Mardin Province, Turkey

Çayköy
- Neighbourhood
- Location in Turkey
- Coordinates: 37.294°N 40.392°E
- Country: Turkey
- Province: Mardin
- District: Derik
- Population (2021): 495
- Time zone: UTC+3 (TRT)

Çayköy (Kurdish: Şeba jêr) is a neighbourhood in the municipality and district of Derik, Mardin Province in Turkey. The village is populated by Kurds of the Şeb tribe and had a population of 495 in 2021.
