= İncesu, Derik =

Village in Mardin Province, Turkey

İncesu
- Neighbourhood
- Location in Turkey
- Coordinates: 37.245°N 40.124°E
- Country: Turkey
- Province: Mardin
- District: Derik
- Population (2021): 546
- Time zone: UTC+3 (TRT)

İncesu (Kurdish: Maşmaşk) is a neighbourhood in the municipality and district of Derik, Mardin Province in Turkey. The village is populated by Kurds of the Sorkan tribe and had a population of 546 in 2021.
