= Çataltepe, Derik =

Village in Mardin Province, Turkey

Çataltepe
- Neighbourhood
- Location in Turkey
- Coordinates: 37.272°N 40.070°E
- Country: Turkey
- Province: Mardin
- District: Derik
- Population (2021): 799
- Time zone: UTC+3 (TRT)

Çataltepe (Kurdish: Erbetê) is a neighbourhood in the municipality and district of Derik, Mardin Province in Turkey. The village is populated by Kurds of the Sorkan tribe and had a population of 799 in 2021.
