= Ballı, Derik =

Village in Mardin Province, Turkey

Ballı
- Neighbourhood
- Location in Turkey
- Coordinates: 37.368°N 40.158°E
- Country: Turkey
- Province: Mardin
- District: Derik
- Population (2021): 352
- Time zone: UTC+3 (TRT)

Ballı (Kurdish: Zorava) is a neighbourhood in the municipality and district of Derik, Mardin Province in Turkey. The village is populated by Kurds of the Metînan tribe and had a population of 352 in 2021.
