= Akçay, Derik =

Village in Mardin Province, Turkey

Akçay
- Neighbourhood
- Location in Turkey
- Coordinates: 37.295°N 40.004°E
- Country: Turkey
- Province: Mardin
- District: Derik
- Population (2021): 560
- Time zone: UTC+3 (TRT)

Akçay (Kurdish: Çemê Qentir) is a neighbourhood in the municipality and district of Derik, Mardin Province in Turkey. The village had a population of 560 in 2021.
