= Civar Çetin =

Turkish footballer

Personal information
- Full name: Civar Çetin
- Date of birth: January 1, 1992 (age 34)
- Place of birth: Derik, Mardin, Turkey
- Height: 1.77 m (5 ft 10 in)
- Position: Central midfielder

Team information
- Current team: Kemerspor
- Number: 92

Youth career
- 2007–2010: Bucaspor

Senior career*
Years	Team	Apps	(Gls)
2010–2017	Bucaspor	50	(2)
2013	→ Batman Petrolspor (loan)	10	(0)
2014	→ Trabzon Akçaabat (loan)	2	(0)
2017–2018	Amed SK	1	(0)
2018–2019	Kahramanmaraşspor	2	(0)
2019–	Kemerspor	11	(1)

International career
2008	Turkey U17	1	(0)
2011	Turkey U19	3	(0)
- * Club domestic league appearances and goals as of 22:59, 14 May 2019 (UTC)

Civar Çetin (born 1 January 1992) is a Turkish professional footballer who currently plays for Amed SK. He is of Kurdish ethnicity.

== Career ==
Çetin signed his first professional contract on 23 June 2008 and made his domestic league debut on 3 December 2010. Çetin has also earned one cap for the Turkey U-18 squad.
