= Siege of Dara (573) =

Sasanian victory over the Byzantines

- Part of Byzantine–Sasanian War of 572–591
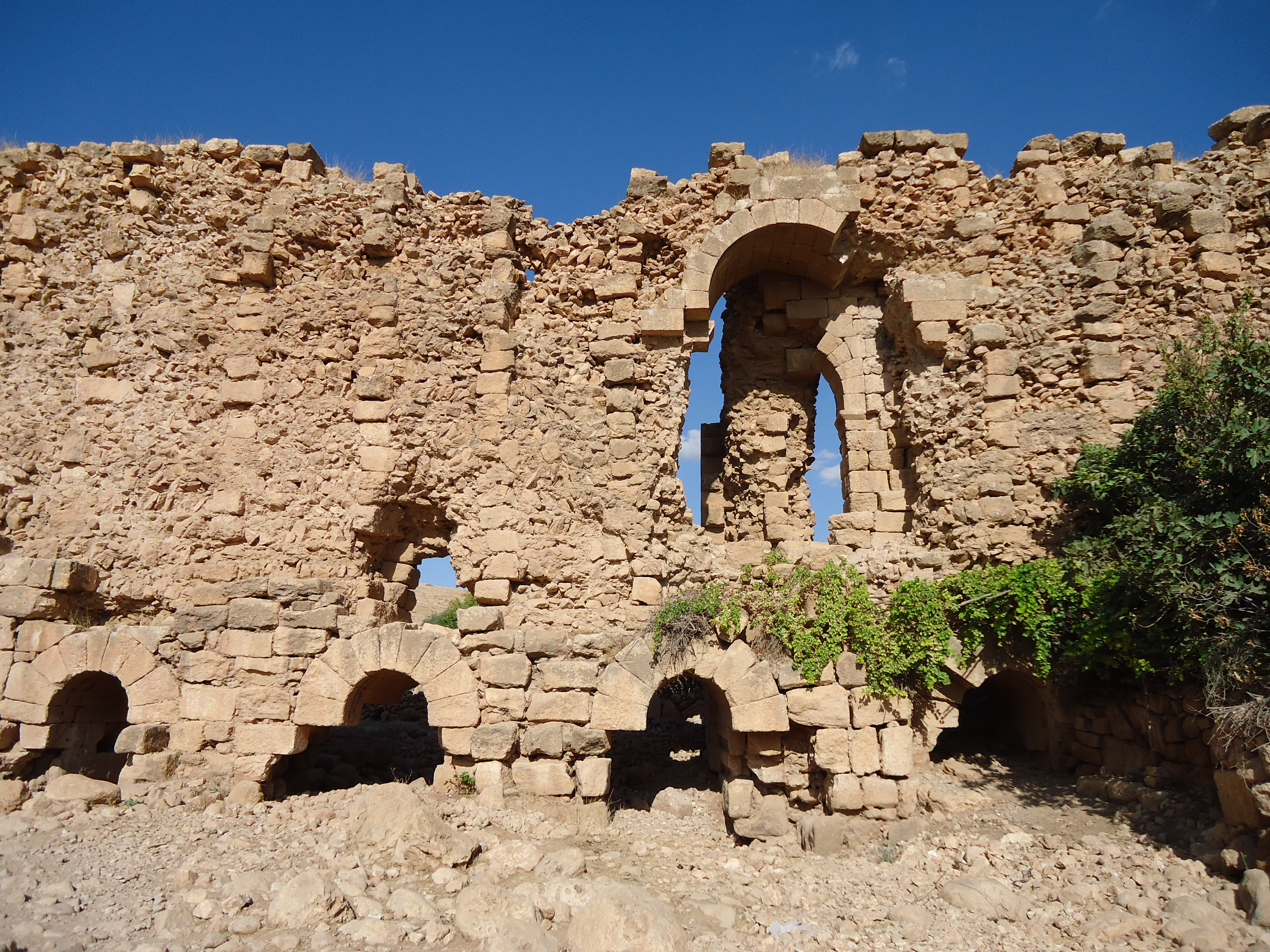
- Ruins of the fortifications of Dara
Date	573
Location	Dara (modern-day Oğuz, Mardin, Turkey)
Result	Sasanian victory

Belligerents
Sasanian Empire	Byzantine Empire

Commanders and leaders
Khosrow I Izadgushasp; Fariburz; Bahram Chobin	Sergius †; Ioannes (POW)

Strength
23,000 cavalry 40,000 infantry	Unknown

Casualties and losses
Unknown	Unknown

The siege of Dara was raised by the Sasanian king Khosrow I in 573 during the Byzantine–Sasanian War of 572–591. The fortified city fell after 4 months.

The Sasanians cut through a hill to divert the city's water supply, and used captured Roman ballistae from the abandoned Roman Siege of Nisibis (573).

The news of the fall of Dara, long a major Byzantine stronghold in Upper Mesopotamia, contributed to Emperor Justin's mental health decline. Bahram Chobin was commander of the cavalry force in the siege, and was promoted to the Spahbed of the North after this victory.

== Sources ==
- http://www.iranicaonline.org/articles/dara-the-name-of-a-parthian-city-and-of-a-byzantine-garrison-town-of-the-sasanian-period
- Greatrex, Geoffrey; Lieu, Samuel N. C. (2002). The Roman Eastern Frontier and the Persian Wars (Part II, 363–630 AD). New York and London: Routledge (Taylor & Francis). pp. 142–153. ISBN 0-415-14687-9.
- Martindale, John R., ed. (1992). The Prosopography of the Later Roman Empire: Volume III, AD 527–641. Cambridge: Cambridge University Press. ISBN 0-521-20160-8.
- Nicholson, Oliver; Canepa, Matthew; Daryaee, Touraj (2018). "Khosrow I Anoshirvan". In Nicholson, Oliver (ed.). The Oxford Dictionary of Late Antiquity. Oxford: Oxford University Press. ISBN 978-0-19-866277-8.
- Shahbazi, A. Sh. (1988). "Bahrām VI Čōbīn". Encyclopaedia Iranica, Vol. III, Fasc. 5. London et al. pp. 514–522.
- Whitby, Michael; Whitby, Mary (1986). The History of Theophylact Simocatta. Oxford, United Kingdom: Clarendon Press. ISBN 978-0-19-822799-1.
