= Böğrek, Derik =

Village in Mardin Province, Turkey

Böğrek
- Neighbourhood
- Location in Turkey
- Coordinates: 37.353°N 40.182°E
- Country: Turkey
- Province: Mardin
- District: Derik
- Population (2021): 122
- Time zone: UTC+3 (TRT)

Böğrek (Kurdish: Beyrok) (Note: Also known as Beyrog, Bayruk, Bayrouk, Beyrük, or Beyrök.) is a neighbourhood in the municipality and district of Derik, Mardin Province in Turkey. The village is populated by Kurds of the Xidiran tribe and had a population of 122 in 2021.

== History ==
Beyrog (today called Böğrek) was historically inhabited by Armenians. There were 5 Armenian hearths in 1880. It was served by the Surb Daniel vank. It was located in the Derik kaza in the Diyarbakır sanjak in the Diyarbekir vilayet in c. 1900. It was populated by 532 Armenians in 1914.

== Bibliography ==
- Jongerden, Joost; Verheij, Jelle, eds. (2012). Social Relations in Ottoman Diyarbekir, 1870-1915. Brill.
- Kévorkian, Raymond H. (2006). "Demographic Changes in the Armenian Population of Diarbekir, 1895-1914". In Richard G. Hovannisian (ed.). Armenian Tigranakert/Diarbekir and Edessa/Urfa. Mazda Publishers. pp. 250–284.
