= Aşağımezraa, Derik =

Village in Mardin Province, Turkey

Aşağımezraa
- Neighbourhood
- Location in Turkey
- Coordinates: 37.428°N 40.227°E
- Country: Turkey
- Province: Mardin
- District: Derik
- Population (2021): 128
- Time zone: UTC+3 (TRT)

Aşağımezraa (Kurdish: Mezra Newalê) is a neighbourhood in the municipality and district of Derik, Mardin Province in Turkey. The village is populated by Kurds of the Metînan tribe and had a population of 128 in 2021.
