= Dara Dam =

Coordinates: 37.1830°N 40.9512°E

- Interactive map of Dara Dam
- Location: Dara, Turkey
- Opening date: Ca. 560 AD

Dam and spillways
- Impounds: River Cordes

The Dara Dam was a Roman arch dam at Dara in Mesopotamia (modern-day Turkey), a rare pre-modern example of this dam type. The modern identification of its site is uncertain, but may rather point to a common gravity dam.

== Ancient account ==
The construction and design of the dam was related by the East Roman historian Procopius around 560 AD in his treatise on the architectural achievements of the Justinian I era (De Aedificiis II.3). His report is notable for its clear understanding of arch action and the distribution of water pressure in arch dams; it provides the earliest description of such types of dams as opposed to the gravity dam, the standard design throughout antiquity and beyond.

Procopius makes two essential points clear: first, the dam had a curved plan in order to withstand the water pressure, and did not follow a more or less curved line just because this was where the most solid bedrock was found, and secondly, the thrust of the water was not contained by the sheer weight of the structure (as in gravity dams), but transferred by the abutments to the wing walls of the gorge through the curvature of the lying arch. Procopius writes:

At a place about forty feet removed from the outer fortifications of the city, between the two cliffs between which the river runs, he constructed a barrier of proper thickness and height. The ends of this he so mortised into each of the two cliffs, that the water of the river could not possibly get by that point, even if it should come down very violently...This barrier was not built in a straight line, but was bent into the shape of a crescent, so that the curve, by lying against the current of the river, might be able to offer still more resistance to the force of the stream.

Another ancient dam working by arch action was the Glanum Dam in France.

== Modern exploration ==
Field work on the ground by the German scholar Günther Garbrecht in the late 1980s has raised some doubts about whether Procopius's accounts are to be interpreted as referring to an arch dam. Garbrecht was able to identify a dam site near the ancient city-walls whose characteristics were consistent with Procopius' precise description—except for the crescent-shaped contour of the dam.

The discovered structure, a ca. 4 m wide and 5 m high masonry wall with a Roman concrete core, had an estimated crest length of 180–190 m; its middle section was destroyed on a length of 60–70 m. Although it cannot be ruled out that the dam once followed a slightly curved course in the gap, the extant flanking walls rather indicate a polygonal ground plan. In this case, the Dara Dam would have resisted the water pressure by its sheer weight, not any arch action. Garbrecht surmises that the irregular shape of the dam may have led Procopius to a poetical allusion to the crescent-shaped firmament. By his own admission, however, his observations in situ fell short of a systematic hydrological and topographical field survey which he urged in view of the continuing deterioration of the ancient site.

== See also ==
- List of Roman dams and reservoirs
- Roman architecture
- Roman engineering

== Sources ==
- Garbrecht, Günther; Vogel, Alexius (1991), "Die Staumauern von Dara", in Garbrecht, Günther (ed.), Historische Talsperren, vol. 2, Stuttgart: Verlag Konrad Wittwer, pp. 263–276, ISBN 3-87919-158-1
- Garbrecht, Günther (2004), "Procopius und die Wasserbauten von Dara", in Ohlig, Christoph (ed.), Wasserbauten im Königreich Urartu und weitere Beiträge zur Hydrotechnik in der Antike, Schriften der Deutschen Wasserhistorischen Gesellschaft, vol. 5, Norderstedt: Books on Demand, pp. 105–132, ISBN 3-8334-1502-9
- Hodge, A. Trevor (1992), Roman Aqueducts & Water Supply, London: Duckworth, ISBN 0-7156-2194-7
- Hodge, A. Trevor (2000), "Reservoirs and Dams", in Wikander, Örjan (ed.), Handbook of Ancient Water Technology, Technology and Change in History, vol. 2, Leiden: Brill, pp. 331–339, ISBN 90-04-11123-9
- Schnitter, Niklaus (1978), "Römische Talsperren", Antike Welt, 8 (2): 25–32
- Schnitter, Niklaus (1987a), "Verzeichnis geschichtlicher Talsperren bis Ende des 17. Jahrhunderts", in Garbrecht, Günther (ed.), Historische Talsperren, Stuttgart: Verlag Konrad Wittwer, pp. 9–20, ISBN 3-87919-145-X
- Schnitter, Niklaus (1987b), "Die Entwicklungsgeschichte der Bogenstaumauer", in Garbrecht, Günther (ed.), Historische Talsperren, Stuttgart: Verlag Konrad Wittwer, pp. 75–96, ISBN 3-87919-145-X
- Smith, Norman (1971), A History of Dams, London: Peter Davies, ISBN 0-432-15090-0
