= Kuyulu, Derik =

Village in Mardin Province, Turkey

Kuyulu
- Neighbourhood
- Location in Turkey
- Coordinates: 37.216°N 40.202°E
- Country: Turkey
- Province: Mardin
- District: Derik
- Population (2021): 349
- Time zone: UTC+3 (TRT)

Kuyulu (Kurdish: Selmê) (Note: Also known as Salme, Selmi or Sulme.) is a neighbourhood in the municipality and district of Derik, Mardin Province in Turkey. The village is populated by Kurds of the Şêxan tribe and had a population of 349 in 2021.

== History ==
Selmi (today called Kuyulu) was historically inhabited by Armenians. It was located in the Derik kaza in the Diyarbakır sanjak in the Diyarbekir vilayet in c. 1900. In 1914, the village's population was 200, including a few Catholic families who were visited by a priest from Tell Armen.

== Bibliography ==
- Courtois, Sébastien de (2004). The Forgotten Genocide: Eastern Christians, The Last Arameans. Translated by Vincent Aurora. Gorgias Press.
- Jongerden, Joost; Verheij, Jelle, eds. (2012). Social Relations in Ottoman Diyarbekir, 1870-1915. Brill.
