= Nasala =

Nasala was an Ancient city and bishopric in Roman Mesopotamia and remains a Latin Catholic titular see.

Its present location in Asian Turkey is unclear.

== History ==
Nasala was important enough in the Late Roman province of Mesopotamia Secunda to become a suffragan of its Metropolitan Archbishopric (Dara(s), replaced in the 19th century by Rhesaina), but would fade.

== Titular see ==
It was nominally restored in 1933 as a Latin Catholic titular bishopric, but remains without incumbent.

== Source and External link ==
- GCatholic
