= Denktaş, Derik =

Village in Mardin Province, Turkey

Denktaş
- Neighbourhood
- Location in Turkey
- Coordinates: 37.204°N 40.101°E
- Country: Turkey
- Province: Mardin
- District: Derik
- Population (2021): 210
- Time zone: UTC+3 (TRT)

Denktaş (Kurdish: Xêdûk) is a neighbourhood in the municipality and district of Derik, Mardin Province in Turkey. The village had a population of 210 in 2021.
