= Kuruçay, Derik =

Village in Mardin Province, Turkey

Kuruçay
- Neighbourhood
- Location in Turkey
- Coordinates: 37.472°N 40.029°E
- Country: Turkey
- Province: Mardin
- District: Derik
- Population (2021): 103
- Time zone: UTC+3 (TRT)

Kuruçay (Kurdish: Zemberor) is a neighbourhood in the municipality and district of Derik, Mardin Province in Turkey. The village had a population of 103 in 2021.
