= Tepebağ, Derik =

Village in Mardin Province, Turkey

Tepebağ
- Neighbourhood
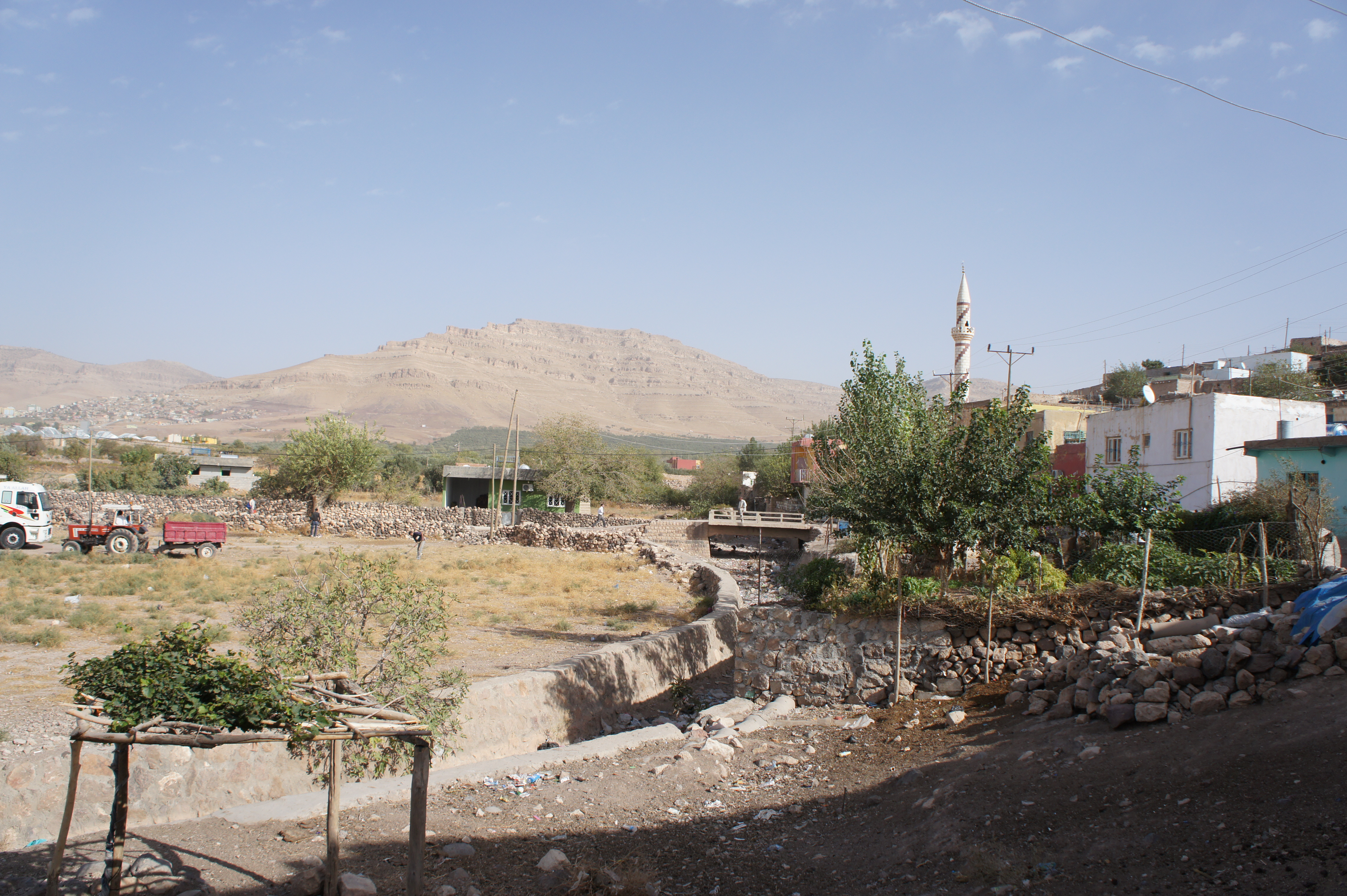

- Location within Turkey
- Coordinates: 37.339°N 40.269°E
- Country: Turkey
- Province: Mardin
- District: Derik
- Population (2021): 2,069
- Time zone: UTC+3 (TRT)

Tepebağ (Kurdish: Tilbisim) is a neighbourhood in the municipality and district of Derik, Mardin Province in Turkey. The village is populated by Kurds of the Rutan and Xidiran tribes and had a population of 2,069 in 2021.
