= Kanatlı, Derik =

Village in Mardin Province, Turkey

Kanatlı
- Neighbourhood
- Location in Turkey
- Coordinates: 37.119°N 40.137°E
- Country: Turkey
- Province: Mardin
- District: Derik
- Population (2021): 123
- Time zone: UTC+3 (TRT)

Kanatlı (Kurdish: Heyal) is a neighbourhood in the municipality and district of Derik, Mardin Province in Turkey. The village had a population of 123 in 2021.
