= Bülent Tekin =

- Born: 15 February 1954 (age 72); Derik, Mardin, Turkey
- Writing career
- Period: 1974 – present
- Genres: Poetry, Novel
- Subject: Literature
- Website: www.bulenttekin.net

Bülent Tekin (born 15 February 1954), Kurdish poet and writer, Turkish citizen. In the 1970s he wrote two novels (“Son” and “Money”), a collection of “Social Poems”, and a research document on the socialism in Allende's Chile, all four of which were confiscated by the police, thus “lost” and unpublished. He contributed to Gırgır, a leading satirical journal. Tekin prepared a TV program of political analysis for Dijle TV. He is married with two children.

== Childhood ==
He was born in the town called Derik, where he began primary school. Soon his father Abdülaziz Tekin (Azîzê Pîrê) decided to send him to a school in Mardin for a better education. Thanks to the friendship between their families, Bülent Tekin and Murathan Mungan (also a poet and novelist) became childhood friends. Tekin attended two years of middle school in Ankara and the third year in Çermik. He finished high school in Diyarbakır, at Ziya Gökalp Lisesi.

== Literary Life ==
He was impressed by the stories and tales he was told in his childhood and he started to write. At Primary School (Mardin Ebul’ula Ilkokulu) he won the first prize for writing a composition, organized by the Governorship of Mardin. He began writing poems in high school. He wrote two novels at university, while also writing poetry.

== Politics ==
In the 1970s he was an active member of Istanbul Cultural Association of Higher Education (İYÖKD). He focussed on the Kurdish question. Due to several obstacles, he did not graduate from either the Chemistry Department or the Faculty of Law. He took place on the stage of Kurdistan Revolutinory and at the beginning of the PKK. During the mid 1970s he was active in the movement called The Voice of the Kurdistan Revolution. (KDS)

== Works ==
- Kızıldan Sarıya, (From Red to Yellow), Poetry
- Tarih Tarih Olsun, (Let History be History), Poetry
- Sevdanla Yaşayacaksan, (If you will live with your Love), Poetry
- Kral Situ’nun Hikâyesi, (King Situ's Story), Novel
- Barışla Güzeldir Sevdam, (My Love is Beautiful with Peace), Poetry
- Feyyo’nun Felsefesi, (Feyyo's Philosophy), Novel
- Ölümü Vurmak Güneşi Öpmek, (Shooting Death and Kissing the Sun), Poetry
- Bir Türkiye Çıkmazı, (Deadend specific to Turkey), Essays
- Kartal Yuvası-Mardin Tarihçedir, (Eagle's Nest-Mardin is History), Historical Novel
- Köpekleşmenin Şerefi, (Honour of Becoming a Dog), Satire
- Vatan Millet Diyarbakır, (Homeland Nation Diyarbakır), Satire
- Kürt Sorunu Ve Sayılmayan İsyanlar, (Kurdish Question and the Uprises not considered), Analysis
- Ana Tanrıçadan Modern Köleye, (From The Mother Goddess To The Modern Slave) Essays

== See also ==
- Kurdish literature
