= Maria Goranova =

Bulgarian-American academic

Maria Goranova (Bulgarian: Мария Горанова) is professor of management at the University of Wisconsin Milwaukee. She conducts research on shareholder empowerment and activism, corporate governance, and corporate strategy. She serves as editor of Corporate Governance: An International Review, and on the editorial board of Journal of Management, and is a member of the Academy of Management, International Association for Business and Society, and Strategic Management Society. Her research has been published in a number of leading journals including Academy of Management Review, Strategic Management Journal, Journal of Management Studies, Academy of Management Annals, Organization Science, Journal of Management, Academy of Management Perspectives, Journal of Business Research, and Academy of Management Proceedings. She is also recipient of Distinguished Papers and Best Reviewer Awards from the Academy of Management.

== Early life and education ==
Born in Sofia, Bulgaria, Maria Goranova studied at Sofia University. She finished her MBA in 1998 after receiving Tempus award by the European Union to study in France at the Université des Sciences et Technologies de Lille. She received a doctorate in business administration from Syracuse University in 2007.

== Professional career ==
Maria Goranova conducts research at the intersection of corporate governance, shareholder empowerment, and strategy, examining the implications of corporate governance for strategic issues such as mergers and acquisitions and corporate diversification. She is also studying shareholder activism and executive compensation issues. Prior to joining academia she worked for FPBank, TMF Services, and as chief accountant for SIAD BG, Praxair. She joined University of Wisconsin Milwaukee faculty in 2007 and became an associate professor in 2013.

== Publications ==
- Zajac, E., & Goranova M., 2024. "When the principal is the firm's problem: Principal costs and their corporate governance implications". Academy of Management Review. In Press. doi:10.5465/amr.2022.0479.
- Goranova M., Ren Y., Sagarra M., Singh S., Clark C. 2024. "Corporate governance and the Fourth Industrial Revolution: promises and challenges". Handbook of Research on Strategic Leadership in the Fourth Industrial Revolution. doi:10.4337/9781802208818.00030.} Eds. Simsek Z., Heavey C., & Fox, B., Edward Elgar Publishing
- Chuah K., DesJardine M., Goranova M., Henisz W. 2024. "Shareholder activism research: A system-level view". Academy of Management Annals. 18 (1): 82–120. doi:10.5465/annals.2022.0069.
- Castañer X., Goranova M., Hermes N., Kavadis N., Zattoni A. 2022. "Ownership and corporate governance across institutional contexts". Corporate Governance: An International Review. 30 (6): 638–655. doi:10.1111/corg.12491. hdl:11370/5d18ed3f-7b62-42b3-843c-278092452adb.
- Goranova M., Ryan L.V. 2022. "The Corporate Objective Revisited: The Shareholder Perspective". Journal of Management Studies. 59 (2): 526–554. doi:10.1111/joms.12714.
- Koehn D., Goranova M. 2018. "Do Investors See Value in Ethically Sound CEO Apologies? Investigating Stock Market Reaction to CEO Apologies". Journal of Business Ethics. 152: 311–322. 2018. doi:10.1007/s10551-016-3301-9.
- Goranova M., Abouk R., Nystrom P., Soofi E. 2017. Corporate governance antecedents to shareholder activism: A zero-inflated process
- Hou W., Priem R., Goranova M. 2017. Does One Size Fit All? Investigating Pay–Future Performance Relationships Over the "Seasons" of CEO Tenure.
- Goranova M., & Ryan L. (Eds.) 2015. Shareholder Empowerment: A New Era in Corporate Governance. New York: Palgrave-Macmillan.
- Goranova, M.; Ryan, L. (2014). "Shareholder Activism: A Multidisciplinary Review". Journal of Management. 40 (5): 1230–1268. doi:10.1177/0149206313515519. S2CID 30344538.
- Hadani, M.; Goranova, M.; Khan, R. (2011). "Institutional Investors, Shareholder Activism, and Earnings Management". Journal of Business Research. 64 (12): 1352–1360. doi:10.1016/j.jbusres.2010.12.004. S2CID 2080303.
- Goranova, M.; Dharwadkar, R.; Brandes, P. (2010). "Owners on Both Sides of the Deal: Mergers and Acquisitions and Overlapping Institutional Ownership". Strategic Management Journal. 31 (10): 1114–1135. doi:10.1002/smj.849.
- Dharwadkar, Ravi; Goranova, Maria; Brandes, Pamela; Khan, Raihan (June 2008). "Institutional Ownership and Monitoring Effectiveness: It's Not Just How Much but What Else You Own". Organization Science. 19 (3): 419–440. doi:10.1287/orsc.1080.0359. S2CID 20262306.
- Brandes, Pamela; Goranova, Maria; Hall, Steven (February 2008). "Navigating Shareholder Influence: Compensation Plans and the Shareholder Approval Process". Academy of Management Perspectives. 22 (1): 41–57. doi:10.5465/amp.2008.31217511. S2CID 7026747.
- Goranova M., Dharwadkar R., Brandes P. 2008. Owners on Both Sides of the Deal: Mergers and Acquisitions and Overlapping Institutional Ownership, Academy of Management Best Paper Proceedings, 2008
- Goranova, Maria; Alessandri, Todd M.; Brandes, Pamela; Dharwadkar, Ravi (2007). "Managerial ownership and corporate diversification: a longitudinal view". Strategic Management Journal. 28 (3): 211–225. doi:10.1002/smj.570. S2CID 9690044.
- Brandes, P; Hadani, M.; Goranova, M. (2006). "Stock Options Expensing: An Examination of Agency and Institutional Theory Explanations". Journal of Business Research. 59 (5): 595–603. doi:10.1016/j.jbusres.2005.09.018. S2CID 15673504.
