= Çağıl, Derik =

Village in Mardin Province, Turkey

Çağıl
- Neighbourhood
- Location in Turkey
- Coordinates: 37.268°N 40.177°E
- Country: Turkey
- Province: Mardin
- District: Derik
- Population (2021): 793
- Time zone: UTC+3 (TRT)

Çağıl (Kurdish: Qubik) is a neighbourhood in the municipality and district of Derik, Mardin Province in Turkey. The village had a population of 793 in 2021.
