= Dumanlı, Derik =

Village in Mardin Province, Turkey

Dumanlı
- Neighbourhood
- Location in Turkey
- Coordinates: 37.330°N 40.159°E
- Country: Turkey
- Province: Mardin
- District: Derik
- Population (2021): 537
- Time zone: UTC+3 (TRT)

Dumanlı (Kurdish: Xirar) is a neighbourhood in the municipality and district of Derik, Mardin Province in Turkey. The village is populated by Kurds of the Sorkan tribe and had a population of 537 in 2021.

== Geography ==
It is 92 km away from Mardin city center and 13 km away from Derik district.
