= Boyaklı, Derik =

Village in Mardin Province, Turkey

Boyaklı
- Neighbourhood
- Location in Turkey
- Coordinates: 37.226°N 40.305°E
- Country: Turkey
- Province: Mardin
- District: Derik
- Population (2021): 1,798
- Time zone: UTC+3 (TRT)

Boyaklı (Kurdish: Qizil, Qizila şên) is a neighbourhood in the municipality and district of Derik, Mardin Province in Turkey. The village is populated by Kurds of the Metînan and Sorkan tribes and had a population of 1,798 in 2021.
