= Pirinçli, Derik =

Village in Mardin Province, Turkey

Pirinçli
- Neighbourhood
- Location in Turkey
- Coordinates: 37.464°N 39.983°E
- Country: Turkey
- Province: Mardin
- District: Derik
- Population (2021): 2,379
- Time zone: UTC+3 (TRT)

Pirinçli (Kurdish: Ketu) is a neighbourhood in the municipality and district of Derik, Mardin Province in Turkey. The village is populated by Kurds of the Sefan tribe and had a population of 2,379 in 2021.
