= Karataş, Derik =

Village in Mardin Province, Turkey

Karataş
- Neighbourhood
- Location in Turkey
- Coordinates: 37.269°N 40.132°E
- Country: Turkey
- Province: Mardin
- District: Derik
- Population (2021): 616
- Time zone: UTC+3 (TRT)

Karataş (Kurdish: Kufirlê) is a neighbourhood in the municipality and district of Derik, Mardin Province in Turkey. The village is populated by Kurds of the Sorkan tribe and had a population of 616 in 2021.
