= Akıncılar, Derik =

Village in Mardin Province, Turkey

Akıncılar
- Neighbourhood
- Location in Turkey
- Coordinates: 37.536°N 40.135°E
- Country: Turkey
- Province: Mardin
- District: Derik
- Population (2021): 813
- Time zone: UTC+3 (TRT)

Akıncılar (Kurdish: Tirbamamo) is a neighbourhood in the municipality and district of Derik, Mardin Province in Turkey. The village is populated by Kurds of the Metînan tribe and had a population of 813 in 2021.
