= Dikmen, Derik =

Village in Mardin Province, Turkey

Dikmen
- Neighbourhood
- Location in Turkey
- Coordinates: 37.429°N 39.999°E
- Country: Turkey
- Province: Mardin
- District: Derik
- Population (2021): 661
- Time zone: UTC+3 (TRT)

Dikmen (Kurdish: Kanîzil) is a neighbourhood in the municipality and district of Derik, Mardin Province in Turkey. The village is populated by Kurds of the Sefan tribe and had a population of 661 in 2021.
