= Köseveli, Derik =

Village in Mardin Province, Turkey

Köseveli
- Neighbourhood
- Location in Turkey
- Coordinates: 37.209°N 40.224°E
- Country: Turkey
- Province: Mardin
- District: Derik
- Population (2021): 110
- Time zone: UTC+3 (TRT)

Köseveli (Kurdish: Kosewelî) is a neighbourhood in the municipality and district of Derik, Mardin Province in Turkey. The village had a population of 110 in 2021.
