= Koçyiğit, Derik =

Village in Mardin Province, Turkey

Koçyiğit
- Neighbourhood
- Location in Turkey
- Coordinates: 37.280°N 40.224°E
- Country: Turkey
- Province: Mardin
- District: Derik
- Population (2021): 747
- Time zone: UTC+3 (TRT)

Koçyiğit (Kurdish: Rewşet) is a neighbourhood in the municipality and district of Derik, Mardin Province in Turkey. The village is populated by Kurds of the Rutan tribe and had a population of 747 in 2021.
