= Hisaraltı, Derik =

Village in Mardin Province, Turkey

Hisaraltı
- Neighbourhood
- Location in Turkey
- Coordinates: 37.398°N 40.186°E
- Country: Turkey
- Province: Mardin
- District: Derik
- Population (2021): 763
- Time zone: UTC+3 (TRT)

Hisaraltı (Kurdish: Rebet) is a neighbourhood in the municipality and district of Derik, Mardin Province in Turkey. The village is populated by Kurds of the Heramî tribe and had a population of 763 in 2021.
