= Bozok, Derik =

Village in Mardin Province, Turkey

Bozok
- Neighbourhood
- Location in Turkey
- Coordinates: 37.287°N 40.362°E
- Country: Turkey
- Province: Mardin
- District: Derik
- Population (2021): 903
- Time zone: UTC+3 (TRT)

Bozok (Kurdish: Meşkina) is a neighbourhood in the municipality and district of Derik, Mardin Province in Turkey. The village is populated by Kurds of the Abasan, Lêf and Xidiran tribes and had a population of 903 in 2021.
