= Kayacık, Derik =

Village in Mardin Province, Turkey

Kayacık
- Neighbourhood
- Location within Turkey
- Coordinates: 37.316°N 40.142°E
- Country: Turkey
- Province: Mardin
- District: Derik
- Population (2021): 92
- Time zone: UTC+3 (TRT)

Kayacık (Kurdish: Mixat) is a neighbourhood in the municipality and district of Derik, Mardin Province in Turkey. The village is populated by Kurds of the Mahmûdî tribe and had a population of 92 in 2021.
