= Soğukkuyu, Derik =

Village in Mardin Province, Turkey

Soğukkuyu
- Neighbourhood
- Location in Turkey
- Coordinates: 37.223°N 40.018°E
- Country: Turkey
- Province: Mardin
- District: Derik
- Population (2021): 293
- Time zone: UTC+3 (TRT)

Soğukkuyu (Kurdish: Şaweled) is a neighbourhood in the municipality and district of Derik, Mardin Province in Turkey. The village had a population of 293 in 2021.
