= Doğancı, Derik =

Village in Mardin Province, Turkey

Doğancı
- Neighbourhood
- Location in Turkey
- Coordinates: 37.269°N 40.095°E
- Country: Turkey
- Province: Mardin
- District: Derik
- Population (2021): 113
- Time zone: UTC+3 (TRT)

Doğancı (Kurdish: Bizdoxan) is a neighbourhood in the municipality and district of Derik, Mardin Province in Turkey. The village is populated by Kurds of the Mahmûdî tribe and had a population of 113 in 2021.
