= Beşbudak, Derik =

Village in Mardin Province, Turkey

Beşbudak
- Neighbourhood
- Location in Turkey
- Coordinates: 37.144°N 40.210°E
- Country: Turkey
- Province: Mardin
- District: Derik
- Population (2021): 727
- Time zone: UTC+3 (TRT)

Beşbudak (Kurdish: Qibilme) is a neighbourhood in the municipality and district of Derik, Mardin Province in Turkey. The village had a population of 727 in 2021.
