= Konak, Derik =

Village in Mardin Province, Turkey

Konak
- Neighbourhood
- Location in Turkey
- Coordinates: 37.138°N 40.244°E
- Country: Turkey
- Province: Mardin
- District: Derik
- Population (2021): 393
- Time zone: UTC+3 (TRT)

Konak (Kurdish: Elaska) is a neighbourhood in the municipality and district of Derik, Mardin Province in Turkey. The village is populated by Kurdish-speaking Arabs who are of the Erbanî tribe. The villagers are of Tayy descent. It had a population of 393 in 2021.
