= Pınarcık, Derik =

Village in Mardin Province, Turkey

Pınarcık
- Neighbourhood
- Location in Turkey
- Coordinates: 37.386°N 40.204°E
- Country: Turkey
- Province: Mardin
- District: Derik
- Population (2021): 47
- Time zone: UTC+3 (TRT)

Pınarcık (Kurdish: Fitnê) is a neighbourhood in the municipality and district of Derik, Mardin Province in Turkey. The village is populated by Kurds of the Rutan tribe and had a population of 47 in 2021.
