= Frederick Cordes =

German politician (born 1986)

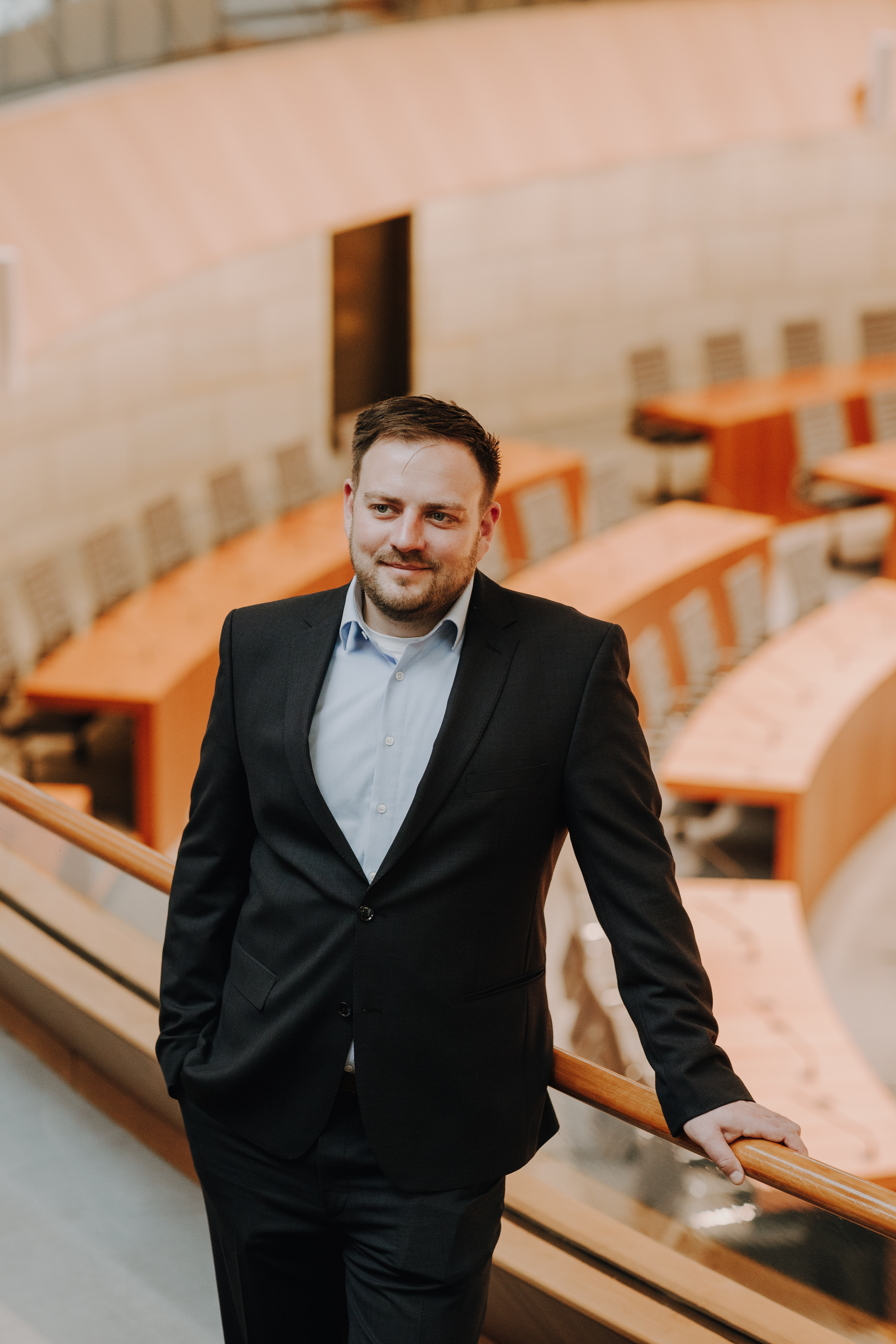
- Cordes in 2023

Member of the Landtag of North Rhine-Westphalia
- Incumbent
- Assumed office 1 November 2020
- Preceded by: Marc Herter

Personal details
- Born: 26 February 1986 (age 40) Oberhausen
- Party: Social Democratic Party

Frederick Cordes (born 26 February 1986 in Oberhausen) is a German politician serving as a member of the Landtag of North Rhine-Westphalia since 2020. He has served as secretary general of SPD North Rhine-Westphalia since 2023.
