= Issız, Derik =

Village in Mardin Province, Turkey

Issız
- Neighbourhood
- Location in Turkey
- Coordinates: 37.262°N 40.014°E
- Country: Turkey
- Province: Mardin
- District: Derik
- Population (2021): 214
- Time zone: UTC+3 (TRT)

Issız (Kurdish: Hedbê) is a neighbourhood in the municipality and district of Derik, Mardin Province in Turkey. The village had a population of 214 in 2021.
