= Aydınlar, Derik =

Village in Mardin Province, Turkey

Aydınlar
- Neighbourhood
- Location in Turkey
- Coordinates: 37.384°N 40.063°E
- Country: Turkey
- Province: Mardin
- District: Derik
- Population (2021): 372
- Time zone: UTC+3 (TRT)

Aydınlar (Kurdish: Kasan) is a neighbourhood in the municipality and district of Derik, Mardin Province in Turkey. The village had a population of 372 in 2021.
