= Konuk, Derik =

Village in Mardin Province, Turkey

Konuk
- Neighbourhood
- Location in Turkey
- Coordinates: 37.252°N 40.318°E
- Country: Turkey
- Province: Mardin
- District: Derik
- Population (2021): 179
- Time zone: UTC+3 (TRT)

Konuk (Kurdish: Remok) is a neighbourhood in the municipality and district of Derik, Mardin Province in Turkey. The village is populated by Kurds of the Sorkan tribe and had a population of 179 in 2021.
