= Gölbaşı, Derik =

Village in Mardin Province, Turkey

Gölbaşı
- Neighbourhood
- Location in Turkey
- Coordinates: 37.208°N 40.364°E
- Country: Turkey
- Province: Mardin
- District: Derik
- Population (2021): 400
- Time zone: UTC+3 (TRT)

Gölbaşı (Kurdish: Bedrasê) is a neighbourhood in the municipality and district of Derik, Mardin Province in Turkey. The village is populated by Kurds of the Erbanî tribe and had a population of 400 in 2021.
