= Kuşçu, Derik =

Village in Mardin Province, Turkey

Kuşçu
- Neighbourhood
- Location in Turkey
- Coordinates: 37.293°N 40.255°E
- Country: Turkey
- Province: Mardin
- District: Derik
- Population (2021): 242
- Time zone: UTC+3 (TRT)

Kuşçu (Kurdish: Girsarinc) is a neighbourhood in the municipality and district of Derik, Mardin Province in Turkey. The village had a population of 242 in 2021.
