= Başaran, Derik =

Village in Mardin Province, Turkey

Başaran
- Neighbourhood
- Location in Turkey
- Coordinates: 37.116°N 40.227°E
- Country: Turkey
- Province: Mardin
- District: Derik
- Population (2021): 200
- Time zone: UTC+3 (TRT)

Başaran (Kurdish: Misrik) is a neighbourhood in the municipality and district of Derik, Mardin Province in Turkey. The village had a population of 200 in 2021.
