= Mülkiye Esmez =

Kurdish politician and former mayor of Derik, Turkey

- Born: 1975 (age 50–51); Derik, Mardin Province, Turkey
- Occupation: Politician
- Years active: 2013–present
- Known for: Mayor of Derik, Political Activism
- Title: Mayor of Derik
- Term: 2019–present
- Political party: Peoples' Democratic Party (HDP)
- Criminal charges: Accused of PKK terrorism charges
- Criminal status: Detained and arrested

Mülkiye Esmez (born 1975, Derik, Turkey) is a politician of the Peoples Democratic Party (HDP) and former Mayor of Derik in the Mardin province.

== Political career ==
She was involved in the foundation of the Derik branch of the Peoples' Democratic Congress (HDK) in 2013 and was elected into the Municipal Council of Mardin in the local election of 2014. In the local elections of 2019 she was elected as the mayor of Derik with over 69%. After she assumed as a mayor, she complained the state appointed trustee who held the office before her, left the municipality indebted. In November the same year she first detained and later arrested together with two other female mayors of the Mardin province. All three were accused of terror charges in relation to the Kurdistan Workers' Party (PKK).

=== Legal prosecution and detention ===
Having been arrested in Mardin, she was transferred to Tarsus prison in December 2019. In March 2021, the prosecutor Bekir Sahin before the Court of Cassation asked for a political ban of 5 years for her and 686 other HDP politicians, together with a closure of the HDP before the Constitutional Court.
