= Bozbayır, Derik =

Village in Mardin Province, Turkey

Bozbayır
- Neighbourhood
- Location in Turkey
- Coordinates: 37.356°N 40.092°E
- Country: Turkey
- Province: Mardin
- District: Derik
- Population (2021): 431
- Time zone: UTC+3 (TRT)

Bozbayır (Kurdish: Mansûrî) is a neighbourhood in the municipality and district of Derik, Mardin Province in Turkey. The village is populated by Kurds of the Metînan tribe and had a population of 431 in 2021.
