= Kocatepe, Derik =

Village in Mardin Province, Turkey

Kocatepe
- Neighbourhood
- Location in Turkey
- Coordinates: 37.235°N 40.166°E
- Country: Turkey
- Province: Mardin
- District: Derik
- Population (2021): 763
- Time zone: UTC+3 (TRT)

Kocatepe (Kurdish: Dêşî) (Note: Also known as Deshi or Meşkinan.) is a neighbourhood in the municipality and district of Derik, Mardin Province in Turkey. The village had a population of 763 in 2021.

== History ==
Deshi (today called Kocatepe) was historically inhabited by Armenians. It was located in the Derik kaza in the Diyarbakır sanjak in the Diyarbekir vilayet in c. 1900.

== Bibliography ==
- Jongerden, Joost; Verheij, Jelle, eds. (2012). Social Relations in Ottoman Diyarbekir, 1870-1915. Brill.
