= Kovanlı, Derik =

Village in Mardin Province, Turkey

Kovanlı
- Neighbourhood
- Location in Turkey
- Coordinates: 37.218°N 40.341°E
- Country: Turkey
- Province: Mardin
- District: Derik
- Population (2021): 1,424
- Time zone: UTC+3 (TRT)

Kovanlı (Kurdish: Xirbê Heriyê) is a neighbourhood in the municipality and district of Derik, Mardin Province in Turkey. The village is populated by Kurds of the Erbanî tribe and had a population of 1,424 in 2021.
