= Kovalı, Derik =

Village in Mardin Province, Turkey

Kovalı
- Neighbourhood
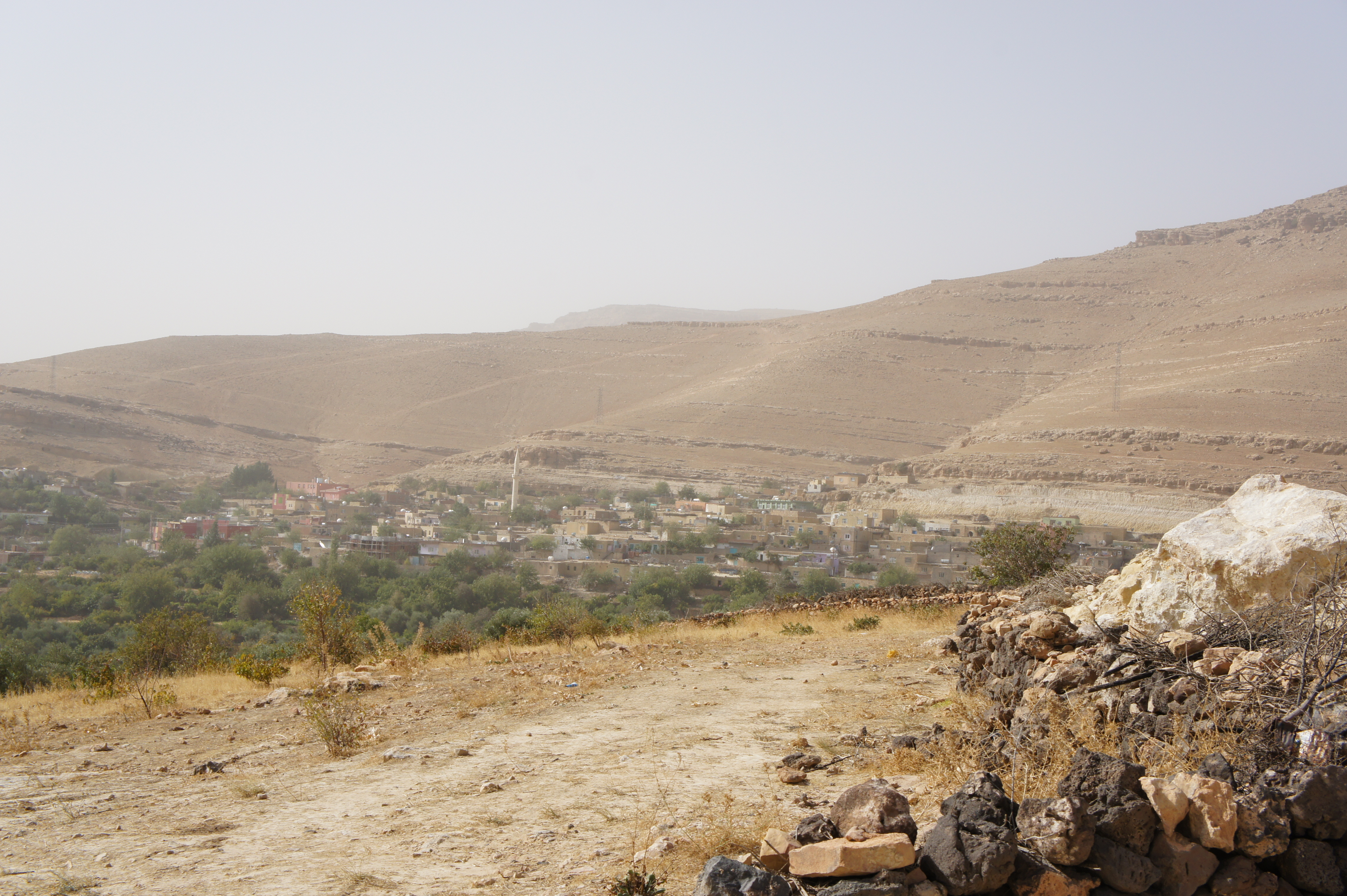
- Tepecik (Heramiya) neighbourhood

- Location within Turkey
- Coordinates: 37.190°N 40.254°E
- Country: Turkey
- Province: Mardin
- District: Derik
- Population (2021): 1,277
- Time zone: UTC+3 (TRT)

Kovalı (Kurdish: Endewl) is a neighbourhood in the municipality and district of Derik, Mardin Province in Turkey. The village had a population of 1,277 in 2021.
