= Alagöz, Derik =

Village in Mardin Province, Turkey

Alagöz
- Neighbourhood
- Location in Turkey
- Coordinates: 37.398°N 40.166°E
- Country: Turkey
- Province: Mardin
- District: Derik
- Population (2021): 96
- Time zone: UTC+3 (TRT)

Alagöz (Kurdish: Talbeş) is a neighbourhood in the municipality and district of Derik, Mardin Province in Turkey. The village is populated by Kurds of the Rutan tribe and had a population of 96 in 2021.
