= Çukursu, Derik =

Village in Mardin Province, Turkey

Çukursu
- Neighbourhood
- Location in Turkey
- Coordinates: 37.437°N 40.152°E
- Country: Turkey
- Province: Mardin
- District: Derik
- Population (2021): 389
- Time zone: UTC+3 (TRT)

Çukursu (Kurdish: Xanuk) is a neighbourhood in the municipality and district of Derik, Mardin Province in Turkey. The village is populated by Kurds of the Metînan tribe and had a population of 389 in 2021.
