= Göktaş, Derik =

Village in Mardin Province, Turkey

Göktaş
- Neighbourhood
- Location in Turkey
- Coordinates: 37.486°N 40.167°E
- Country: Turkey
- Province: Mardin
- District: Derik
- Population (2021): 1,236
- Time zone: UTC+3 (TRT)

Göktaş (Kurdish: Kevirşîn) is a neighbourhood in the municipality and district of Derik, Mardin Province in Turkey. The village is populated by Kurds of the Metînan tribe and had a population of 1,236 in 2021.
