= Hayırlı, Derik =

Village in Mardin Province, Turkey

Hayırlı
- Neighbourhood
- Location in Turkey
- Coordinates: 37.221°N 40.062°E
- Country: Turkey
- Province: Mardin
- District: Derik
- Population (2021): 482
- Time zone: UTC+3 (TRT)

Hayırlı (Kurdish: Mizgewr) is a neighbourhood in the municipality and district of Derik, Mardin Province in Turkey. The village had a population of 482 in 2021.
