= Adakent, Derik =

Village in Mardin Province, Turkey

Adakent
- Neighbourhood
- Location in Turkey
- Coordinates: 37.256°N 40.264°E
- Country: Turkey
- Province: Mardin
- District: Derik
- Population (2021): 355
- Time zone: UTC+3 (TRT)

Adakent (Kurdish: Çildiz) is a neighbourhood in the municipality and district of Derik, Mardin Province in Turkey. The village is populated by Kurds of the Sorkan and Şêxan tribes and had a population of 355 in 2021.
