= Marcian (cousin of Justin II) =

Byzantine general

Marcian (Latin: Marcianus, Greek: Μαρκιανός) was a Byzantine general and a kinsman of Emperor Justin II.

According to John Malalas, he was Justin's cousin, and a nephew of Justinian I, while Michael the Syrian reports that his mother was Justin's maternal aunt.

He was involved in the Byzantine–Sasanian War of 572–591:

"Marcian, cousin of the emperor Justin, who had been appointed commander in the East, was sent against Chosroes in the eighth year of Justin's reign [573]. John, the general of Armenia, and Miranes, the Persian leader (who was also called Baramaanes), collected an army to oppose them. The Armenians were joined by the Colchians, the Abasgi, and Saroes, king of the Alani; Miranes by the Sabiri, Daganes, and the tribe of the Dilmaini."

— Photius, Myriobiblon

Marcian defeated Miranes at the Battle of Sargathon near Nisibis and put him to flight; 1200 Persians were killed and seventy taken prisoners, while the Roman loss was only seven. Marcian then laid siege to Nisibis and Theobothon. Chosroes, when he heard of this got together 40,000 cavalry and more than 100,000 infantry, and hastened to its assistance to attack the Romans. In the meantime Marcian was accused to the emperor of aiming at the throne. Justin, persuaded of the truth of the charge, dismissed him from the command and appointed Theodore, the son of Justinian surnamed Tzirus, in his stead. This led to disturbances, the Romans raised the siege, and Chosroes besieged and reduced Daras.

== Sources ==
- Greatrex, Geoffrey; Lieu, Samuel N. C. (2002). The Roman Eastern Frontier and the Persian Wars (Part II, 363–630 AD). Routledge. ISBN 0-415-14687-9.
- Martindale, John Robert; Jones, Arnold Hugh Martin; Morris, John (1992). The Prosopography of the Later Roman Empire, Volume III: AD 527–641. Cambridge, United Kingdom: Cambridge University Press. ISBN 0-521-20160-8.
