= Taşıt, Derik =

Village in Mardin Province, Turkey

Taşıt
- Neighbourhood
- Location in Turkey
- Coordinates: 37.415°N 40.306°E
- Country: Turkey
- Province: Mardin
- District: Derik
- Population (2021): 108
- Time zone: UTC+3 (TRT)

Taşıt (Kurdish: Taşît) is a neighbourhood in the municipality and district of Derik, Mardin Province in Turkey. The village had a population of 108 in 2021.
