= Siege of Nisibis (573) =

Part of the Byzantine–Sasanian War of 572–591

- Part of the Byzantine–Sasanian War of 572–591
Date	573
Location	Nisibis (modern-day Nusaybin, Mardin, Turkey)
Result	Sasanian victory

Belligerents
Eastern Roman (Byzantine) Empire	Sasanian Empire

Commanders and leaders
Acacius; Marcian	Bahram Gushnasp

Strength
Unknown	Unknown

The Siege of Nisibis took place in 573 when the Byzantine Empire, under Emperor Justin II, besieged the Sasanian city of Nisibis. The Sasanians successfully defended the city and defeated the Roman force.

In line with their tactics during the Iberian War, the Romans mobilized garrisoned engineers for the attack and ordered them to perform complex siege.

According to the Syriac chronicles, the Sasanian forces were able to delay the Roman army, allowing them to prepare for an extensive defence. The reason behind the Roman rout at Nisibis was reportedly due to quarreling amongst their officers. An account also cited a failure of intelligence from Ghassanid scouts, due to which the Romans were unaware of the Sasanian army's movements to the Euphrates junction with the Khabur, which then attacked from the rear, forcing them to lift the siege.

After the siege was lifted, the Sasanians used the Roman trebuchets that were left behind at the successful Siege of Dara, later that year. This particular siege lasted six months and the victory gave Khosrow I another important fortress in eastern Mesopotamia.

== Sources ==
- Greatrex, Geoffrey; Lieu, Samuel N.C., eds. (2002). The Roman Eastern Frontier and the Persian Wars: Part II, AD 363-630. Routledge. pp. 1–408. ISBN 978-0415465304.
- Petersen, Leif Inge Ree (2013). Siege Warfare and Military Organization in the Successor States (400-800 AD): Byzantium, the West and Islam. BRILL. ISBN 978-9004254466.
