= Kutluca, Derik =

Village in Mardin Province, Turkey

Kutluca
- Neighbourhood
- Location in Turkey
- Coordinates: 37°05′55″N 40°10′20″E
- Country: Turkey
- Province: Mardin
- District: Derik
- Population (2021): 735
- Time zone: UTC+3 (TRT)

Kutluca (Kurdish: Warga Xensê) is a neighbourhood in the municipality and district of Derik, Mardin Province in Turkey. The village had a population of 735 in 2021.
