= Derinsu, Derik =

Village in Mardin Province, Turkey

Derinsu
- Neighbourhood
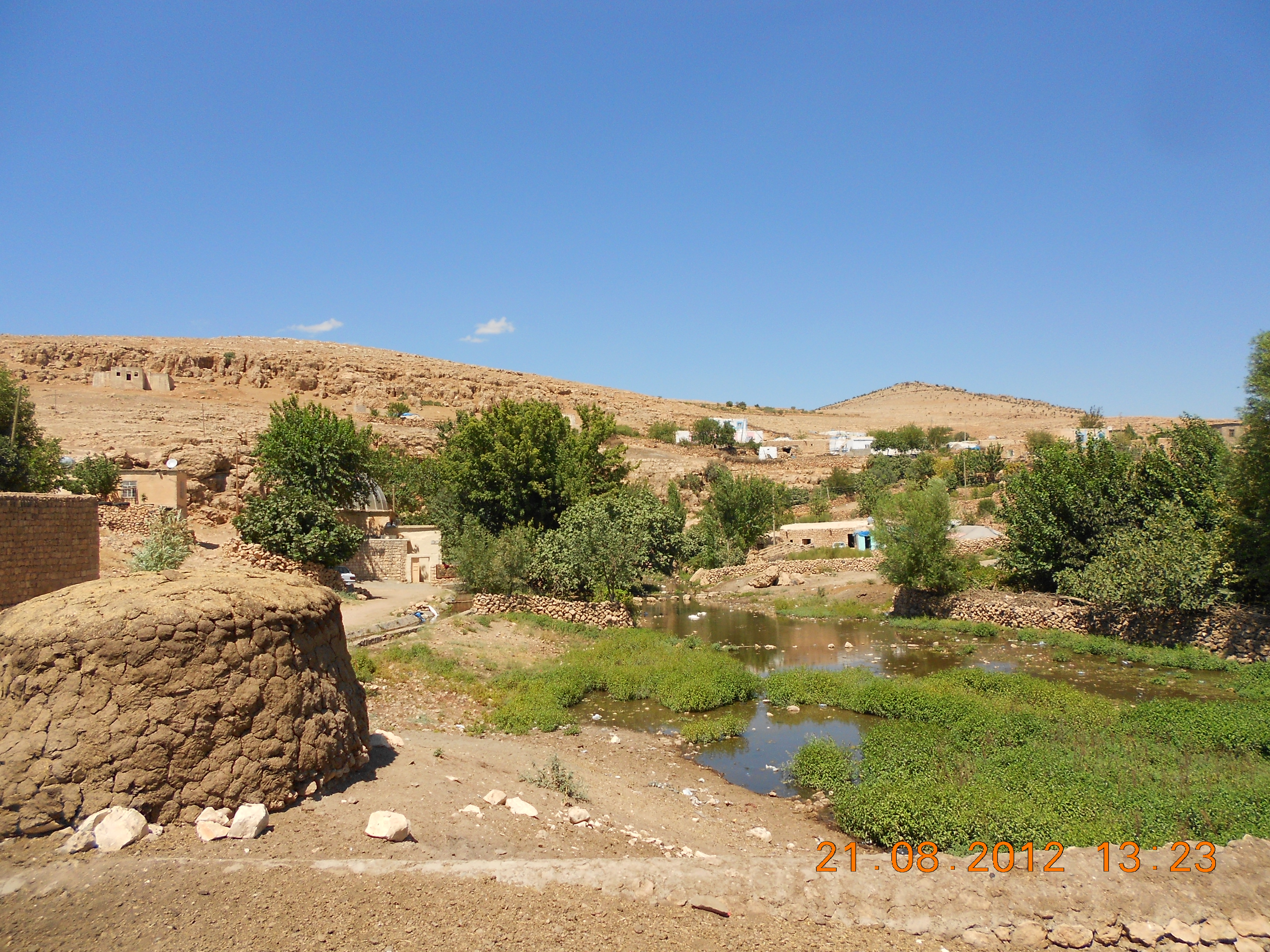

- Location within Turkey
- Coordinates: 37.457°N 40.082°E
- Country: Turkey
- Province: Mardin
- District: Derik
- Population (2021): 1,418
- Time zone: UTC+3 (TRT)

Derinsu (Kurdish: Bixur) is a neighbourhood in the municipality and district of Derik, Mardin Province in Turkey. The village is populated by Kurds of the Metînan tribe and had a population of 1,418 in 2021.
