= Ahmetli, Derik =

Village in Mardin Province, Turkey

Ahmetli
- Neighbourhood
- Location in Turkey
- Coordinates: 37.194°N 40.051°E
- Country: Turkey
- Province: Mardin
- District: Derik
- Population (2021): 103
- Time zone: UTC+3 (TRT)

Ahmetli (Kurdish: Qizil) is a neighbourhood in the municipality and district of Derik, Mardin Province in Turkey. The village had a population of 103 in 2021.
