= Ilıca, Derik =

Village in Mardin Province, Turkey

Ilıca
- Neighbourhood
- Location in Turkey
- Coordinates: 37.307°N 40.284°E
- Country: Turkey
- Province: Mardin
- District: Derik
- Population (2021): 366
- Time zone: UTC+3 (TRT)

Ilıca (Kurdish: Germik) is a neighbourhood in the municipality and district of Derik, Mardin Province in Turkey. The village is populated by Kurds of the Sorkan tribe and had a population of 366 in 2021.
