= Marc Herter =

German politician (born 1974)

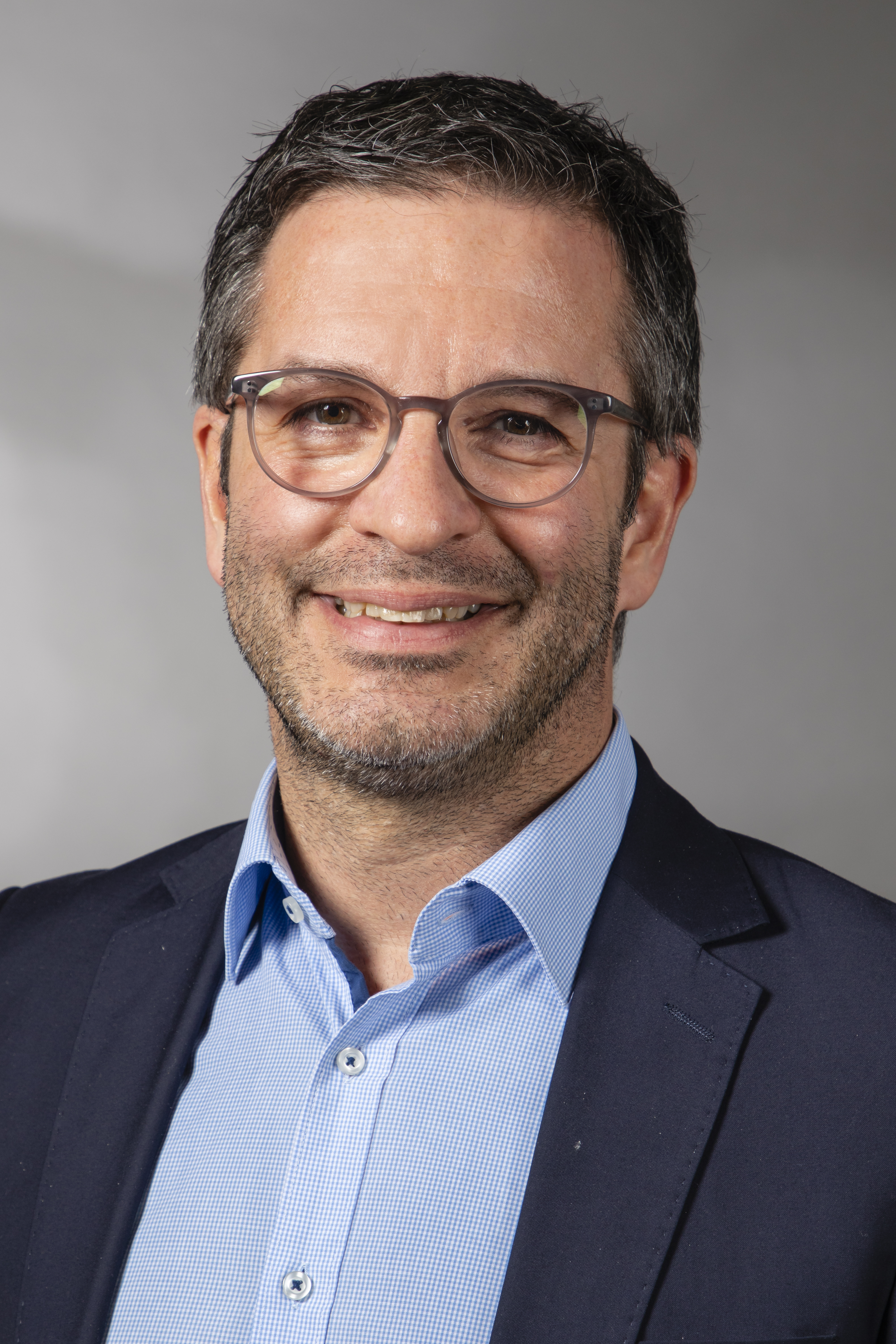
Herter in 2019

Marc Herter (born June 6, 1974, in Hagen) is a German politician of SPD. After he finished school at Beisenkamp-Gymnasium in Hamm, he studied German law at University of Münster. Since 1991 he became member of political party SPD. From 2010 to 2020 Herter was member of the Landtag of North Rhine-Westphalia. Since 2020, Herter has been mayor of Hamm. His partner is the German teacher Sascha Ramsel.
