= Coordes =

Coordes is a surname. Notable people with the surname include:

- Egon Coordes (1944–2025), German football player and coach
- Luis Coordes (born 1999), Dominican football player
