= Bayraklı, Derik =

Village in Mardin Province, Turkey

Bayraklı
- Neighbourhood
- Location in Turkey
- Coordinates: 37.275°N 40.275°E
- Country: Turkey
- Province: Mardin
- District: Derik
- Population (2021): 484
- Time zone: UTC+3 (TRT)

Bayraklı (Kurdish: Girêsor) is a neighbourhood in the municipality and district of Derik, Mardin Province in Turkey. The village is populated by Kurds of the Sorkan tribe and had a population of 484 in 2021.
