= Düztaş, Derik =

Village in Mardin Province, Turkey

Düztaş
- Neighbourhood
- Location in Turkey
- Coordinates: 37.481°N 40.007°E
- Country: Turkey
- Province: Mardin
- District: Derik
- Population (2021): 922
- Time zone: UTC+3 (TRT)

Düztaş (Kurdish: Tahtik) is a neighbourhood in the municipality and district of Derik, Mardin Province in Turkey. The village is populated by Kurds of the Sefan tribe and had a population of 922 in 2021.
