= Mem Ararat =

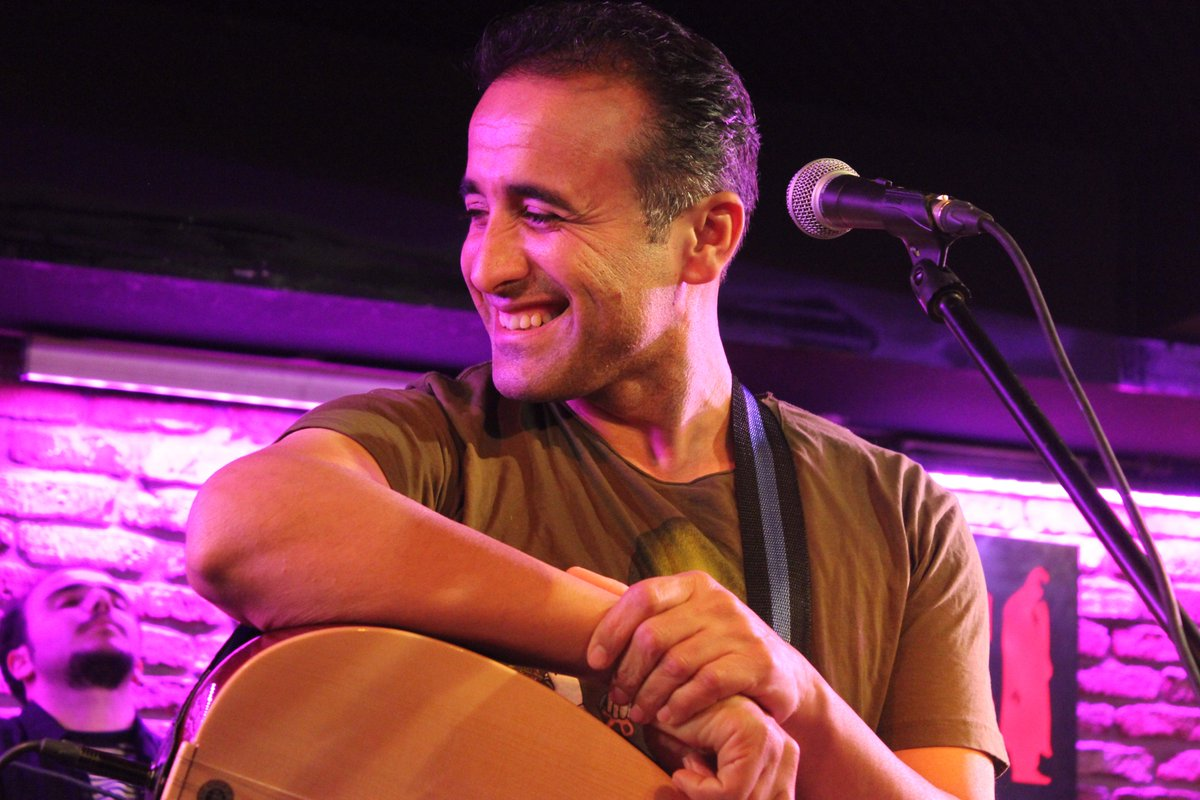

Background information
- Born: September 17, 1981 (age 45); Dêrika Çiyayê Mazî, Mardin Province, Turkey
- Genre: Kurdish folk music
- Instrument: Saz
- Years active: 2014-present

Mem Ararat (born September 17, 1981) is a Kurdish singer, songwriter, and composer.

== Life ==
Ararat was born in Girkê Şêxê village in Dêrik district of Mardin Province. At seven, due to poor economic conditions in his village, his family moved west. In 1991 they returned to Mêrdîn due to political reasons, before moving back again to western Anatolia in 1994, again for political reasons.

Due to these migrations, Ararat could only attend primary school. Though always been interested in music from childhood onwards, opportunities were scarce to develop his talent properly. When he eventually returned home in 2007, he settled down in Kiziltepe, Mardin where he engaged in farming, construction, trading, and trading jobs.

== Career ==
Ararat started his music career in 2014.

=== Concert ban ===
In 2020, his concerts in the provinces of Mersin, Diyarbakır and Bursa were canceled by the Turkish government. Ararat made his statement clear on social media by noting that his live performance ban stems from singing in Kurdish and he also mentioned that he will not stop: “This will not stop us from singing our songs in all [Kurdish] dialects!"

== Discography ==
=== Album ===
- Quling Ewr û Baran (2014)
- Kurdîka (2016)
- Xewna Bajarekî (Dream of a city, 2018)
- Niştiman (Home, 2019)
- Pesna Evînê (2020)

Single

- Pîvok (Crocus, 2019)

=== Video Clips ===
- Payîz (Fall, 2016)
- Zozan (2018)
- Xatirxwestin (2019)
- Çîçekê (Flower, 2019)
- Ji Evareke Amedê (In love in Diyarbakir, 2019)
- Evîna Du Çîya (Love of two mountains, 2019)
- Dilo Ez Bimrim (2018)
