= Cordes (river) =

River in Turkey

Cordes (Ancient Greek: Κόρδης) was a small stream of Mesopotamia which rose in the Mons Masius, and was a tributary of the Chaboras, itself a tributary of the Euphrates. The town of Dara was situated upon its banks.

Justinian's engineers diverted the river towards the city by digging a canal. The river now flowed through the city, ensuring ample water supply. At the same time, by means of diverting its flow to an underground channel which exited 65 km (40 mi) to the north, Dara's garrison was able to deny water to a besieging enemy, a fact which saved the city on several occasions.
