= 30% Club =

Diversity campaign group

The 30% Club is an international campaign group of business chairpersons and CEOs taking action to increase gender diversity on boards and senior management teams.

== History ==
It was established in the United Kingdom in 2010 by Helena Morrissey with the aim of achieving a minimum of 30% female representation on the boards of FTSE 100 companies. That target was reached in September 2018. The club now also has chapters in Australia, Brazil, Canada, East Africa, GCC, Hong Kong, Ireland, Italy, Japan, Malaysia, Southern Africa, Turkey and the U.S. In 2015 Brenda Trenowden was appointed as the new lead for the UK chapter and as Global Chair of the campaign, reflecting its increased reach and scale since launch.

As of June 2019, the leadership structure of the campaign further evolved in response to its ongoing success and international influence, with Ann Cairns joining as global co-chair of the campaign. The Club continues to expand its global footprint and has exceeded its original UK goal, with 30% women sitting on FTSE 100 Boards as of 2021.
