= Yazıcık, Derik =

Village in Mardin Province, Turkey

Yazıcık
- Neighbourhood
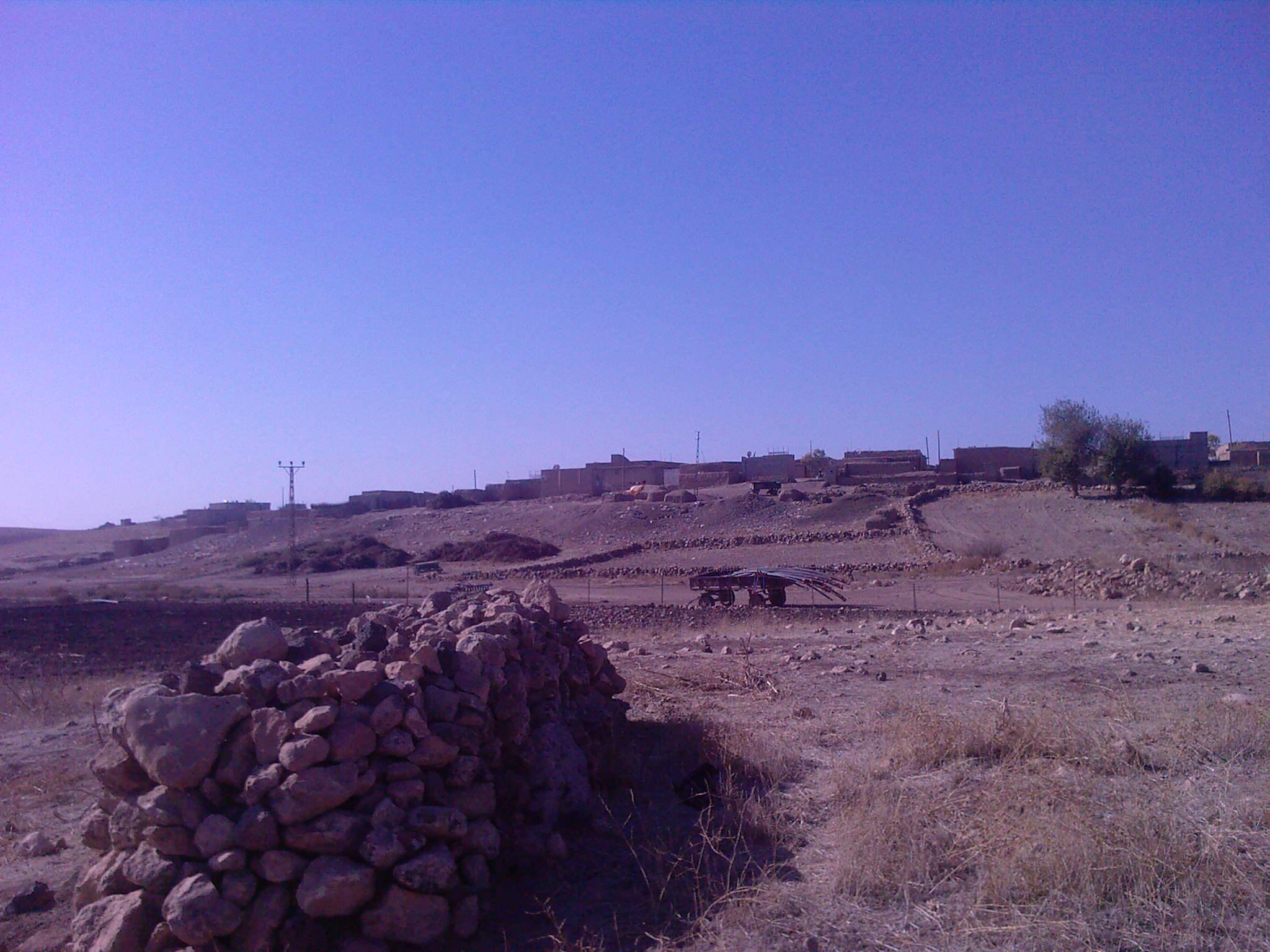

- Location within Turkey
- Coordinates: 37.127°N 40.180°E
- Country: Turkey
- Province: Mardin
- District: Derik
- Population (2021): 404
- Time zone: UTC+3 (TRT)

Yazıcık (Kurdish: Koderê) is a neighbourhood in the municipality and district of Derik, Mardin Province in Turkey. It had a population of 404 in 2021.
