= Enwer Karahan =

Enwer Karahan (born 1962) is a contemporary Kurdish writer. He was born in the district of Dêrik in Mardin province in southeastern Turkey. He was one of the founding members of HADEP in 1994. His articles have appeared in several magazines such as Medya Guneşî, Jiyana Nû, and Roj.

He left Turkey and emigrated to Sweden in 1997. He is now the editor of Berbang, the official organ of the Federation of Kurdish Communities in Sweden (FKKS). He has published several collections of short stories. He is a frequent contributor to online Kurdish magazines such as Nefel.com and Netkurd.com.

== Books ==
1. Şevbihêrkên şevên xalî, 151 pp., Doz Publishers, Istanbul, 2001, ISBN 975-6876-21-2.
2. Duaya êvarê, 127 pp., Elma Publishers, Istanbul, 2003, ISBN 975-8794-05-1.
3. Xanima kozê, 2005.
4. Çû, 2006.
5. Du dilop, Doz Publishers, Istanbul, 2008.
