= Corporate Governance: An International Review =

Academic journal

- Discipline: Corporate Governance
- Language: English

Publication details
- History: Since 1993
- Publisher: John Wiley & Sons Ltd.
- Frequency: Bimonthly
- Impact factor: 3.39 (2018)

Standard abbreviations
- ISO 4: Corp. Gov.

Indexing
- ISSN: 0964-8410 (print); 1467-8683 (web)
- LCCN: 93655027

Links
- Journal homepage; Online access

Corporate Governance: An International Review is an academic journal published six times a year by Wiley. This journal publishes international business research on comparative corporate governance, covering topics such as shareholder activism, mutual funds, regulations and shareholder rights.

The editorial mission of the journal is to learn about both the antecedents and effects of corporate governance practices, policies, and principles from an interdisciplinary conversation. Consequently, the journal publishes articles from scholars operating from a variety of disciplines, including economics, finance, law, management, sociology and political science.

== Abstracting and Indexing ==
Corporate Governance: An International Review is abstracted and indexed in the Social Sciences Citation Index, Scopus, ProQuest, EBSCO, and Emerald Management Reviews. According to the Journal Citation Reports, the journal has a 2022 impact factor of 5.3.

== 20th Anniversary ==
In 2012, Corporate Governance: An International Review celebrated its 20th anniversary with a commemorative conference at the Judge Business School, Cambridge University. The stated aim of the event was to "move the field closer to a global theory by advancing our understanding of national governance bundles". The anniversary was also marked with an online issue of the journal which brought together some of the journal's most highly cited articles.
