= Dara (Mesopotamia) =

East Roman fortress in present-day Mardin Province, Turkey

- Δάρας (Greek)
- Daras, Anastasiopolis, Iustiniana Nova
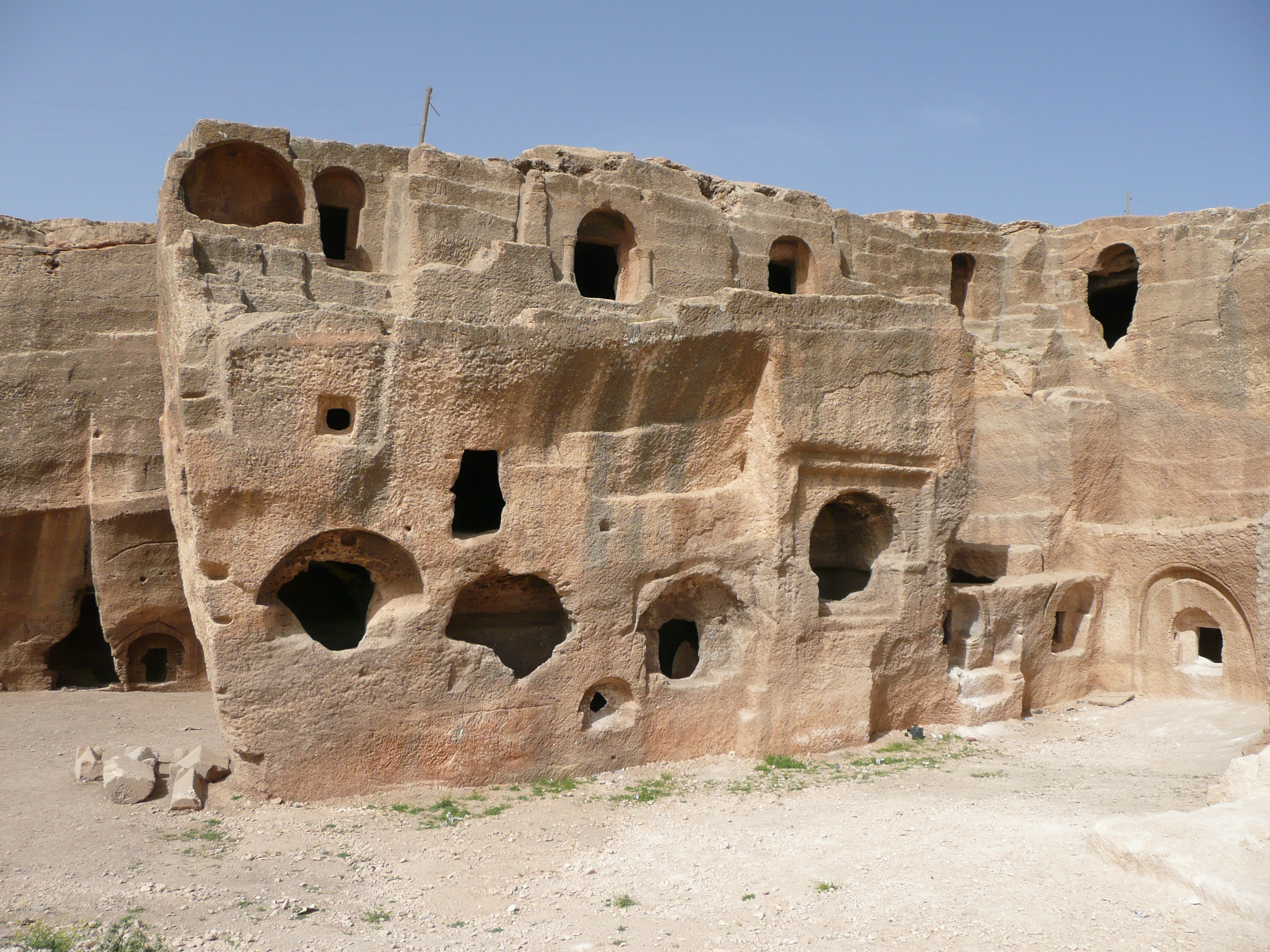
- Ruins of rock-cut building in Daras

- Location within Turkey
- 37°10′40″N 40°56′28″E
- Type: Settlement
- Periods: Late Antiquity
- Location: Oğuz, Mardin Province, Turkey
- Region: Mesopotamia

History
- Built: 505
- Built by: Anastasius I
- Abandoned: After 639
- Event(s): Battle of Dara; Fall of Dara

Dara or Daras (Turkish: Dara Antik Kenti; Greek: Δάρας; Syriac: ܕܪܐ) was an important East Roman fortress city in northern Mesopotamia on the border with the Sassanid Empire. Because of its great strategic importance, it featured prominently in the Roman-Persian conflicts (in 530, 540, 544, 573, and 604). The former archbishopric remains a multiple Catholic titular see. Today, the village of Dara in the Mardin Province occupies its location.

== History ==
=== Foundation by Anastasius ===
During the Anastasian War in 502–506, the Roman armies fared poorly against the Sassanid Persians. According to the Syriac Chronicle of Zacharias of Mytilene, the Roman generals blamed their difficulties on the lack of a strong base in the area, as opposed to the Persians, who held the great city of Nisibis (which until its cession in 363 had served the same purpose for the Romans).

Therefore, in 505, while the Persian King Kavadh I was distracted in the East, Emperor Anastasius I decided to rebuild the village of Dara, only 18 kilometres westwards from Nisibis and just 5 km from the actual border with Persia, to be "a refuge for the army in which they might rest, and for the preparation of weapons, and to guard the country of the Arabs from the inroads of the Persians and Saracens". Masons and workers from all over Mesopotamia were gathered and worked with great haste. The new city was built on three hills, on the highest of which stood the citadel, and endowed with great storehouses, a public bath and water cisterns. It took the name Anastasiopolis (Greek: Ἀναστασιούπολις) and became the seat of the Roman dux Mesopotamiae.

=== Reconstruction by Justinian ===
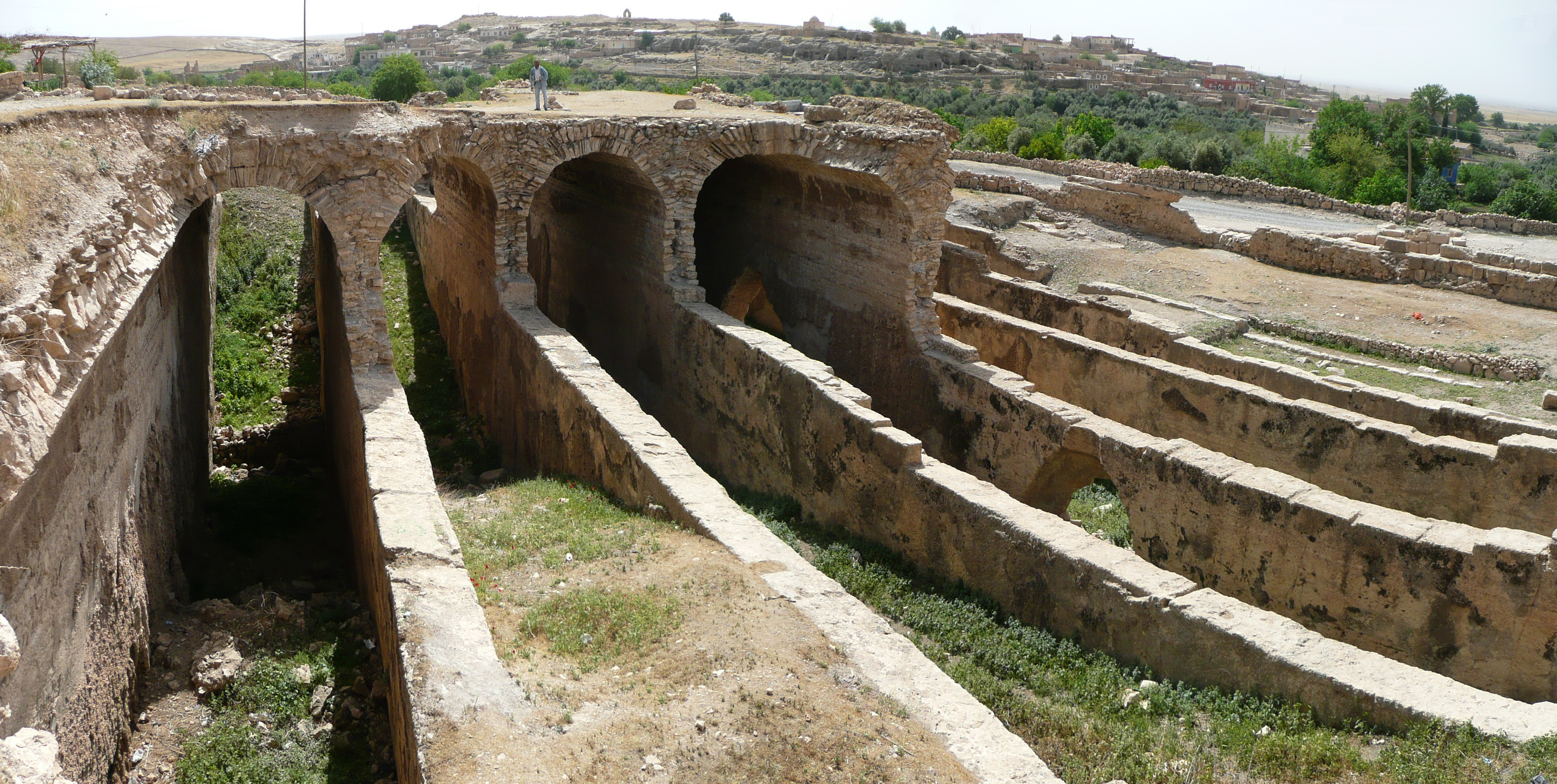
Remains of the cisterns

According to Procopius, the hasty construction of the original walls resulted in poor quality, and the severe weather conditions of the region exacerbated the problem, ruining some sections. Thus Byzantine Emperor Justinian I was compelled to undertake extensive repairs to the city, afterwards renaming it Iustiniana Nova. The walls were rebuilt and the inner wall raised by a new storey, doubling its height to about 20 m (66 ft). The towers were strengthened and raised to three stories (ca. 35 m) high, and a moat dug out and filled with water.

Justinian's engineers also diverted the nearby river Cordes towards the city by digging a canal. The river now flowed through the city, ensuring ample water supply. At the same time, by means of diverting its flow to an underground channel which exited 65 km (40 mi) to the north, the garrison was able to deny water to a besieging enemy, a fact which saved the city on several occasions. To avert the danger of flooding, which had already once wrecked large parts of the city, an elaborate arch dam was built to contain it, one of the earliest known of its kind. In addition, barracks were built for the garrison, and two new churches were constructed, the "Great Church", and one dedicated to St Bartholomew.

=== Later history ===
The city was later besieged and captured by the Persians under Khosrau I in 573–574, but was returned to the Romans by Khosrau II after the Roman-Persian treaty in 591. It was taken again by Khosrau II in 604–05 after a nine-month siege, recovered again for the Roman Empire by Heraclius. Finally captured in 639 by the Arab Muslims, the city then lost its military significance, declined and was eventually abandoned.

=== Modern history ===
Dara became the site of massacre during the Armenian genocide. According to some reports, the cisterns were filled with the bodies of slaughtered Armenians from Diyarbakır, Mardin, and Erzurum in the spring and summer of 1915.

== Ecclesiastical history ==
=== Archbishopric ===
The new city became the seat of a Christian bishop and was at first a Metropolitan see, with three suffragans: Rhesaina (also called Theodosiopolis), Rhandus and Nasala.

Its first known bishop was Eutychianus, who took possession in 506. His successor, Thomas, was deposed in 519 for his opposition to the Council of Chalcedon and died in 540. Mamas was removed in 537. Stephanus took part in the Second Council of Constantinople in 553.

After the 7th-century Arab conquest, Dara again became the seat of Jacobite (Syriac Orthodox) bishops. Between 825 and 860, the archbishop was John of Dara, a prolific theologian. In the 10th century, Syriac Orthodox Diocese of Dara lost its Metropolitan rank, which passed to its former suffragan Rhesaina.

=== Titular Catholic see ===
No longer a residential bishopric, Dara is now listed by the Catholic Church as a titular see, both Latin and in particular for the Syriac Catholic Church, which, though of the West Syriac Rite, is in full communion with the Holy See.

The diocese was nominally restored in the 15th century as the Latin Catholic titular bishopric of Dara.

As such, it has the following incumbents, all of the lowest (episcopal) rank:

- Hubert Léonard, Carmelite Order (O. Carm.) (1474.11.16 – 1489.07.06) and again (1492.12.03 – ?)
- Blasius de Aguinaga (1669.09.09 – ?)
- Nicolás de Ulloa y Hurtado de Mendoza, Augustinian Order (O.E.S.A.) (1677.02.08 – 1679.11.27)
- Francisco Zapata Vera y Morales (1680.03.11 – 1703.04.23)
- Franz Engelbert Barbo von Waxenstein (1703.06.04 – 1706.12.25)

In 1925 it was renamed and Promoted as Metropolitan Titular archbishopric of Dara.

It has been vacant for decades, having had the following incumbents of that (highest) rank :

- Alfonso Archi (1925.11.16 – 1927.03.04)
- Joseph-Marie Le Gouaze (1927.09.29 – 1930.12.05)
- Luigi Fantozzi (1931.01.01 – 1932.01.14)
- Torquato Dini (1933.11.12 – 1934.03.26)
- Antonio Riberi (黎培理) (1934.08.13 – 1967.07.25), as papal diplomat: Apostolic Delegate to Africa for Missions (1934.08.13 – 1945), Apostolic Internuncio (papal envoy) to PR China (1946.07.06 – 1959.02.19), Apostolic Nuncio (papal ambassador) to Ireland (1959.02.19 – 1962.04.28), Apostolic Nuncio to Spain (1962.04.28 – 1967.06.26); later created Cardinal-Priest of San Girolamo della Carità pro hac vice Title (1967.06.29 – 1967.12.16)
- Nicholas Thomas Elko (1967.12.22 – 1971.08.10)

Established as Titular bishopric of Anastasiopolis, suppressed without incumbent, restored in 1979 as titular bishopric of Dara Syrorum (Dara of the Syriacs, or just Dara in Curiate Italian).

It has had the following incumbents, of both the lowest (episcopal) and intermediary (archiepiscopal) ranks:

- Titular Bishop Athanase Matti Shaba Matoka (1979.08.25 – 1983.07.15) (later Archbishop)
- Titular Bishop Flavien Joseph Melki (1996.05.25 – 2026.01.30), Curial bishop of the Syriacs

== See also ==
- Mt. Izla

== Sources and external links ==
Primary sources

- Zacharias of Mytilene, Syriac Chronicle, Book VII, Chapter VI
- Procopius, De Aedificiis, Book II

Secondary sources

- Brian Croke, James Crow: Procopius and Dara, in: Journal of Roman Studies 73 (1983), p. 143–159.
- Italo Furlan, Accertamenti a Dara, Padua 1984
- Michael Whitby: Procopius' description of Dara ("Buildings" II 1-3), in: The defence of the Roman and Byzantine East. Proceedings of a colloquium held at the University of Sheffield in April 1986, Oxford 1986, S. 737–783.
- Gunnar Brands: Ein Baukomplex in Dara-Anastasiopolis, in: Jahrbuch für Antike und Christentum 47 (2004), pp. 144–155.
- Christopher Lillington-Martin, "Archaeological and Ancient Literary Evidence for a Battle near Dara Gap, Turkey, AD 530: Topography, Texts & Trenches", British Archaeological Reports (BAR) –S1717, 2007 The Late Roman Army in the Near East from Diocletian to the Arab Conquest Proceedings of a colloquium held at Potenza, Acerenza and Matera, Italy (May 2005) edited by Ariel S. Lewin and Pietrina Pellegrini with the aid of Zbigniew T. Fiema and Sylvain Janniard. ISBN 978-1-4073-0161-7. (pages 299-311).

Arch dam

- Hodge, A. Trevor (1992), Roman Aqueducts & Water Supply, London: Duckworth, ISBN 0-7156-2194-7
- Hodge, A. Trevor (2000), "Reservoirs and Dams", in Wikander, Örjan (ed.), Handbook of Ancient Water Technology, Technology and Change in History, vol. 2, Leiden: Brill, pp. 331–339, ISBN 90-04-11123-9
- Schnitter, Niklaus (1987a), "Verzeichnis geschichtlicher Talsperren bis Ende des 17. Jahrhunderts", in Garbrecht, Günther (ed.), Historische Talsperren, Stuttgart: Verlag Konrad Wittwer, pp. 9–20, ISBN 3-87919-145-X
- Schnitter, Niklaus (1987b), "Die Entwicklungsgeschichte der Bogenstaumauer", in Garbrecht, Günther (ed.), Historische Talsperren, Stuttgart: Verlag Konrad Wittwer, pp. 75–96, ISBN 3-87919-145-X
- Smith, Norman (1971), A History of Dams, London: Peter Davies, ISBN 0-432-15090-0

External links

- Article on the city by Encyclopædia Iranica
- GCatholic - Latin titular see, with titular incumbent bio links
- GCatholic - Syriac Catholic titular see, with titular incumbent bio links
