= Derik, Turkey =

Derik
- District and municipality
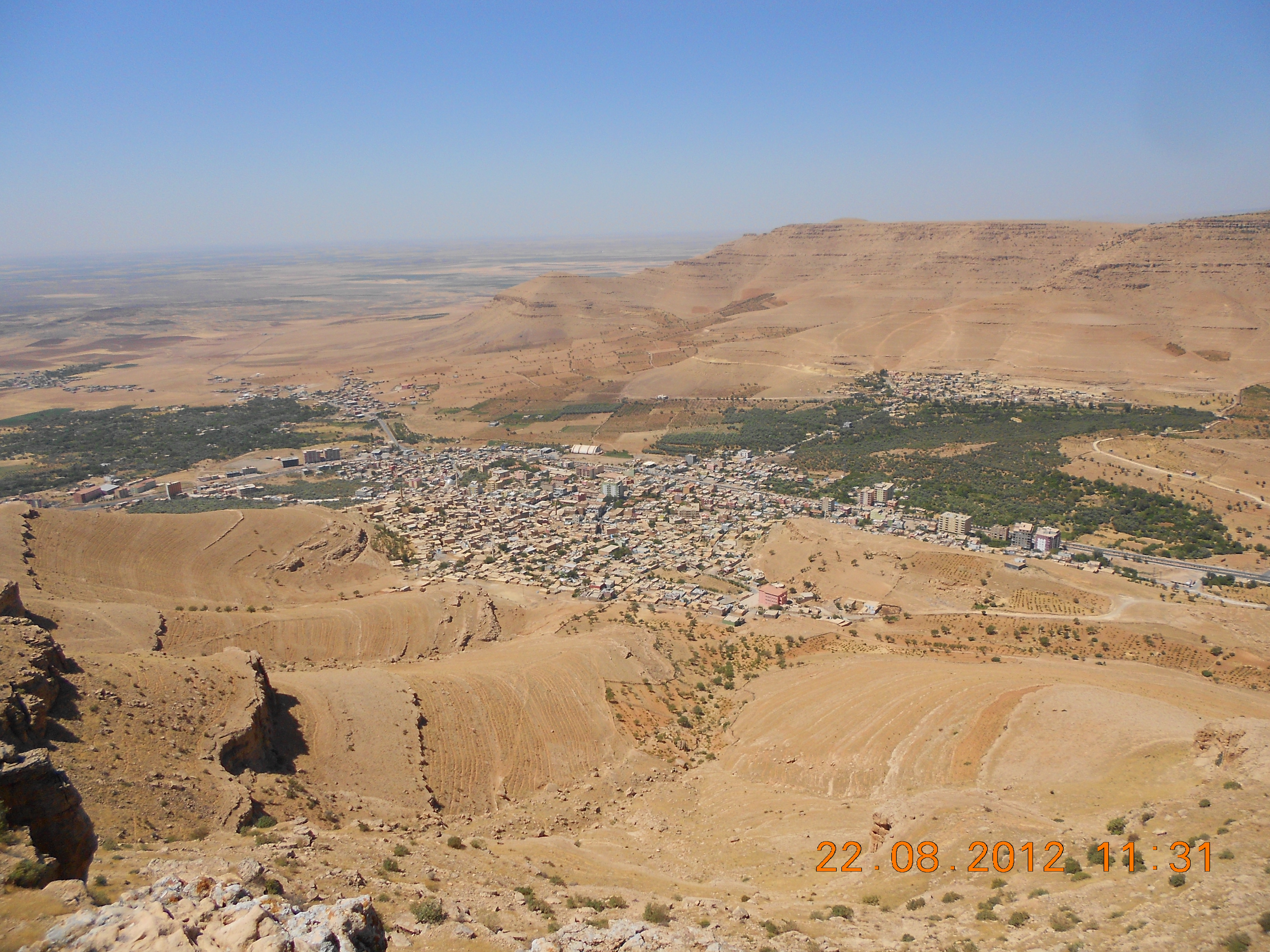

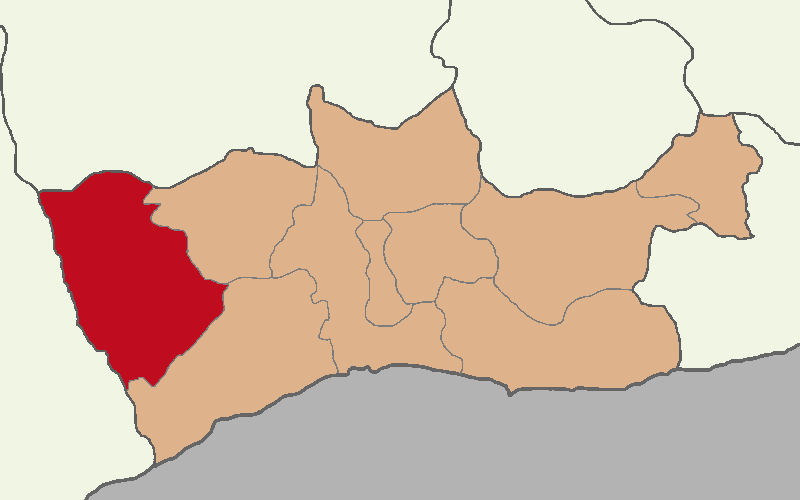
- Map showing Derik District in Mardin Province

- Location within Turkey
- Coordinates: 37°21′57″N 40°16′11″E
- Country: Turkey
- Province: Mardin
- Area: 1,381 km^{2} (533 sq mi)
- Population (2022): 62,028
  - Density: 44.92/km^{2} (116.3/sq mi)
- Time zone: UTC+3 (TRT)
- Area code: 0482
- Website: www.derik.bel.tr

Derik (Kurdish: Dêrîka Çiyayê Mazî) (Note: Also known as Derek, Déréké, Dérik, Derike, Direk, or Dirèk.) is a municipality and district of Mardin Province, Turkey. Its area is 1,381 km^{2}, and its population is 62,028 (2022).

== Etymology ==
The name of the town is derived from "deir" ("monastery" in Arabic and Syriac) and the Armenian ending "-ik".

== History ==
Kurds attempted to pillage the town on 10 November 1895, but were stopped by Ottoman soldiers. The town and district of Derik was part of the Diyarbakır sanjak in the Diyarbekir vilayet in c. 1900.

Amidst the Armenian genocide and Sayfo, on 24 May 1915, Reshid Bey, vali of Diyarbakır sent a delegate and two officers to Derik where they severely beat seven Armenian Catholic notables after they had denied that they had any weapons. Some of them were imprisoned and tortured and only released after having paid 50 liras. The kaymakam of Derik, who had refused to participate in anti-Christian operations without seeing written orders from the government, was killed en route to Diyarbakır.

On 7 June, several Christians were imprisoned and soldiers broke into the Armenian Catholic church, seized documents, and arrested the priest; the Syriac Catholic priest Ibrahim Kuroum had his beard torn off and was forced to crawl on all fours whilst he was kicked and stabbed and finally hacked to pieces. The Protestant priest and the schoolteacher were arrested on 8 June. The Syriac priest and the Armenian Catholic priest were both badly beaten. On 20 June, the prisoners were taken near Khawarouk, where they were tortured and then killed. On 27 June, a few of the remaining priests in prison were killed and roaming gangs seized any male Christian they could find in the streets and imprisoned them. On 28 June, some of the prisoners were roped together and taken to Zinare Sa’our and one other place, where they were murdered. 16 of the remaining 23 men in prison were released after having paid the guards bribes of up to 50 liras, but some of them were then imprisoned again and killed.

During the feasts at the end of Ramadan, many of the Christian artisans who had thus far escaped unscathed as they were not leading members of their community and because they manufactured equipment for the army, were seized and taken to Farashiya and massacred. On the third feast day of Ramadan in August, Christian women and girls were taken to Gorta and slaughtered. On 11 August 1915, the entire Christian population was massacred. The tribes of Babay and the Zerikan tribe resettled at Derik after the First World War.

== Demographics ==
There were 60 Armenian hearths at Derik in 1880. In 1913, there were 40 Chaldean Catholics at Derik, who did not have a church or a priest, and were part of the diocese of Mardin. As per the list presented to the Paris Peace Conference by the Assyro-Chaldean delegation, Derik was populated by 500 Syriacs in 1914. In 1914, the kaza of Derik had 1782 Armenians (356 houses); there were 1250 Armenians at Derik itself who had the medieval Church of Surb Gevorg and a school with 50 pupils. According to the Chaldean Catholic priest Joseph Tfinkdji, the population of Derik was 7000 in 1914, including 60 Syriac Catholics with 1 priest and 1 church, 200 Armenian Catholics, 600 Armenian Gregorians, 100 Syriac Orthodox Christians with 1 priest, and 50 Chaldean Catholics who performed their religious duties with the Armenian Catholics, whilst the rest of the population was Muslim. Prior to the Sayfo and the Armenian genocide, Derik was inhabited by 250 Armenian, Syriac, and Protestant families, according to Ishaq Armalto, the secretary of the Syriac Catholic vice-patriarch in Mardin, Gabriel Tappouni.

By 2014, there was only one Armenian family at Derik.

Mother tongue, Derik District, 1927 Turkish census
Turkish	Arabic	Kurdish	Circassian	Armenian	Unknown or other languages
254	72	14,694	–	17	–

Religion, Derik District, 1927 Turkish census
Muslim	Christian	Jewish	Other and Undeclared
14,949	74	–	41

== Government ==
In the local elections of April 10 Mülkiye Esmez from the Peoples' Democratic Party was elected mayor. But on 15 November 2019 she was detained and a day later dismissed from her post as mayor and the District Governor Hakan Kafkas was appointed as trustee instead.

=== Neighbourhoods ===
There are 80 neighbourhoods in Derik District:

- Adak (Simaqî)
- Adakent (Çildiz)
- Ahmetli (Qizil)
- Akçay (Çemê Qentir)
- Akıncılar (Tirbamamo)
- Alagöz (Talbeş)
- Alanlı (Enterî)
- Alibey (Elîbeg)
- Ambarlı (Heboşî)
- Aşağımezraa (Mezra Newalê)
- Atlı (Qesra Qenco)
- Aydınlar (Kasan)
- Bağarası
- Bahçelievler
- Ballı (Zorava)
- Balova (Balfis)
- Başaran (Misrik)
- Bayırköy (Qizileyşan)
- Bayraklı (Girêsor)
- Beşbudak (Qibilme)
- Böğrek (Beyrok)
- Boyaklı (Qizil)
- Bozbayır (Mansûrî)
- Bozok (Meşkina)
- Burçköy (Birc)
- Çadırlı (Şabana)
- Çağıl (Qubil Çagil)
- Çataltepe (Erbetê)
- Çayköy (Şêba jêr)
- Cevizpınar
- Çukursu (Xanuk)
- Dağ
- Demirli (Demirlê)
- Denktaş (Xêdûk)
- Derinsu (Bixur)
- Dikmen (Kanîzil)
- Doğancı (Bizdoxan)
- Dumanlı (Xirar)
- Dumluca (Sîpnat)
- Düztaş (Tahtik)
- Göktaş (Kevirşîn)
- Gölbaşı (Bedrasê)
- Hayırlı (Mizgewr)
- Hisaraltı (Rebet)
- Ilıca (Germik)
- İncesu (Maşmaşk)
- Issız (Hedbê)
- Kale
- Kanatlı (Heyal)
- Karaburun (Xirbêreş)
- Karataş (Kufirlê)
- Kayacık (Mixat)
- Kocatepe (Dêşî)
- Koçyiğit (Rewşet)
- Konak (Elaska)
- Konuk (Remok)
- Köseveli (Kosewelî)
- Kovalı (Endewl)
- Kovanlı (Xirbê Heriyê)
- Küçükpınar
- Kuruçay (Zemberor)
- Kuşçu (Garsarinc)
- Kutluca (Warga Xensê)
- Kuyulu (Selmê)
- Meşeli (Xerabreşk)
- Ortaca (Reqaqî)
- Pınarcık (Fitnê)
- Pirinçli (Ketu)
- Şahverdi (Şawerdî)
- Şerefli (Şîrîfbaba)
- Soğukkuyu (Şaweled)
- Söğütözü (Qetaro)
- Subaşı (Zok)
- Taşıt (Taşît)
- Tepebağ (Tilbisim)
- Üçkuyu (Bira)
- Üçtepe (Belotî)
- Yazıcık (Koderê)
- Yukarımezraa (Mezra Suravêrkê)
- Zeytinpınar

== Notable people ==
- Qedrîcan (1911–1972), Kurdish poet, writer and translator
- Ahmet Türk (b. 1942), Kurdish politician
- Bülent Tekin (b. 1954), Kurdish poet and writer
- Firat Cewerî (b. 1959), Kurdish writer, translator and journalist
- Enwer Karahan (b. 1962), Kurdish writer
- Leyla Birlik (b. 1974), Kurdish politician
- Mülkiye Esmez (b. 1975), politician
- Mem Ararat (b. 1981), Kurdish singer
- Pervin Chakar (b. 1981), musical artist
- Civar Çetin (b. 1992), footballer

== Bibliography ==
- Avcıkıran, Adem (2009). Kürtçe Anamnez, Anamneza bi Kurmancî (in Kurdish and Turkish).
- Courtois, Sébastien de (2004). The Forgotten Genocide: Eastern Christians, The Last Arameans. Translated by Vincent Aurora. Gorgias Press.
- Gaunt, David (2006). Massacres, Resistance, Protectors: Muslim-Christian Relations in Eastern Anatolia during World War I. Gorgias Press.
- Jongerden, Joost; Verheij, Jelle, eds. (2012). Social Relations in Ottoman Diyarbekir, 1870-1915. Brill.
- Kévorkian, Raymond H. (2006). "Demographic Changes in the Armenian Population of Diarbekir, 1895-1914". In Richard G. Hovannisian (ed.). Armenian Tigranakert/Diarbekir and Edessa/Urfa. Mazda Publishers. pp. 250–284.
- Sinclair, T.A. (1989). Eastern Turkey: An Architectural & Archaeological Survey. Vol. III. Pindar Press. ISBN 9780907132349.
- Wilmshurst, David (2000). The Ecclesiastical Organisation of the Church of the East, 1318–1913 (PDF). Peeters Publishers.
