= Maurice's Sasanian Campaigns (578–581) =

Byzantine campaigns in Persia

Sasanian Campaigns of Maurice
- Part of Byzantine–Sasanian War of 572–591
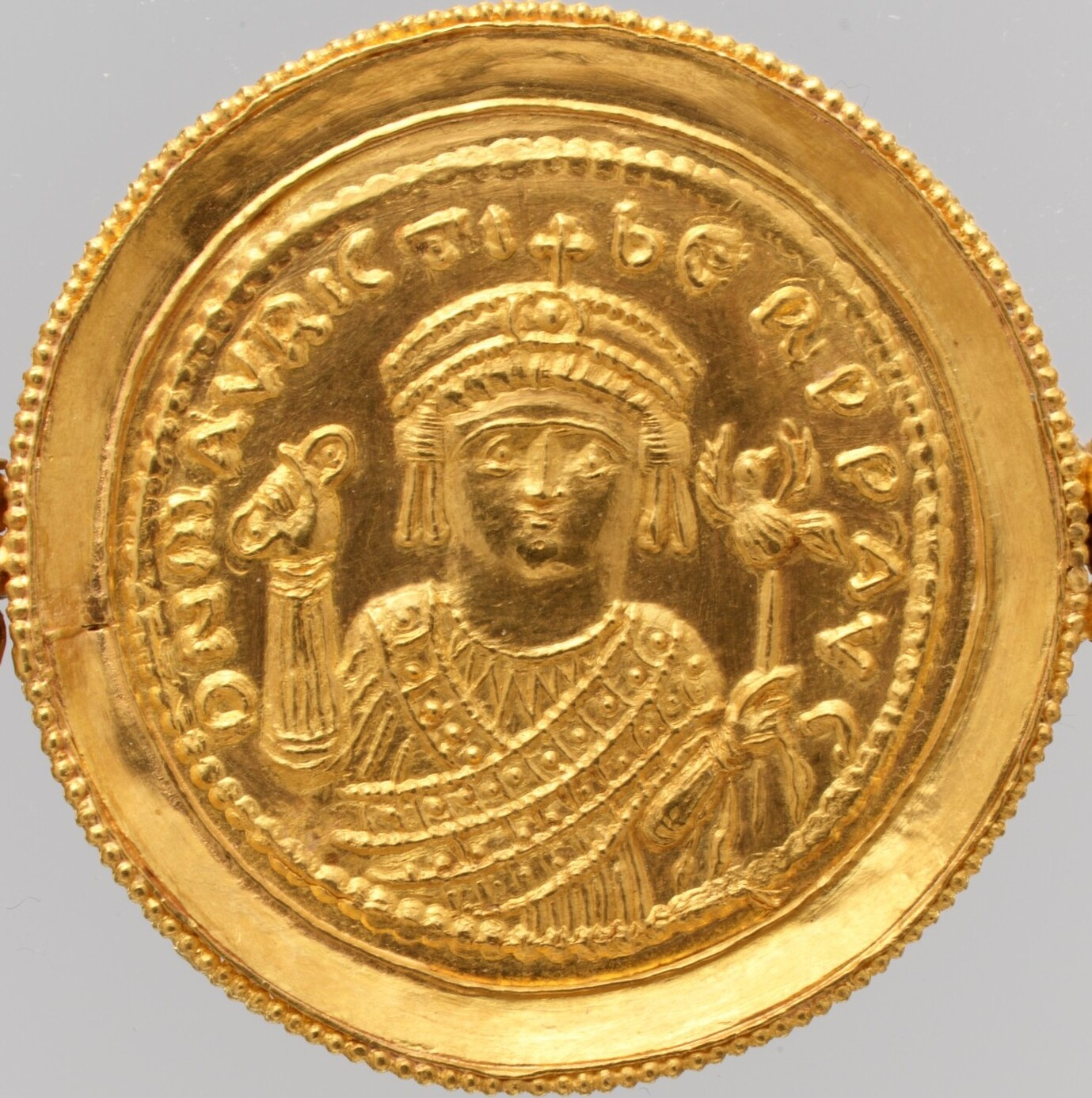
- Gold medallion of Maurice circa 583, from a girdle found in Karavas, Cyprus.
| Date | 578–581 |
| Location | Mesopotamia, Caucasus, Media, Syria |
| Result | Byzantine victory Full results: 578 Campaign: Byzantine victory; 579 Campaign: Byzantine victory; 580 Campaign: Byzantine operational failure; 581 Campaign: Byzantine victory |

Belligerents
| Byzantine Empire; Ghassanids | Sasanian Empire; Sasanian Armenia; Kingdom of Iberia (until 580); Lakhmids; Sabirs |

Commanders and leaders
| Tiberius # Maurice; Flavios Alamoundaros; Cours; Romanus; John Mystacon; Theoderic; Martinus; Constantine † | Khosrow I # Hormizd IV; Bacurius III # Al-Mundhir IV ibn al-Mundhir †; Al-Nu'man III ibn al-Mundhir; Tamkhosrau †; Adarmahan; Varaz Vzur (POW); Mahbod; Binganes |

Strength
| 580: 200,000 in Mesopotamia (John of Ephesus); 581: Around 50,000 at Constantina | 578: 20,000 under Mahbod; 579: 50,000 in Armenia; 581: More than 50,000 at Constantina |

Maurice's Sasanian Campaigns were a series of campaigns conducted by the Byzantine general Maurice against the Sasanian Empire lasting from 578-581. As Magister Militum per Orientem, Maurice oversaw repeated invasions of Persian lands, while also responding to Sasanian counter-incursions into their own land. These campaigns were part of a wider conflict between the two Empires, known as the Byzantine–Sasanian War of 572–591.

== Background ==
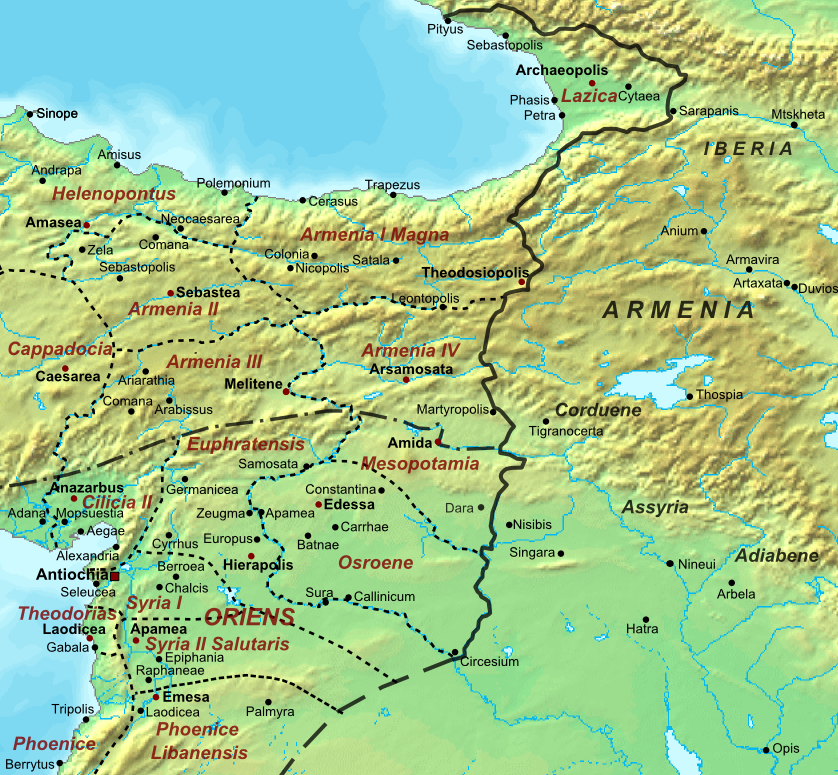
Roman-Sasanian frontier in 565

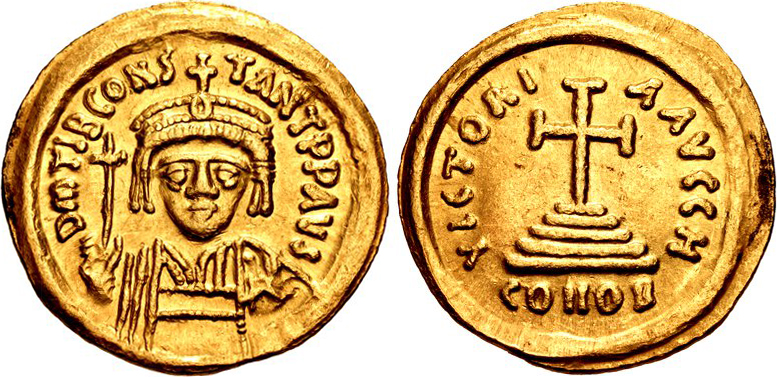
Solidus depicting Tiberius II

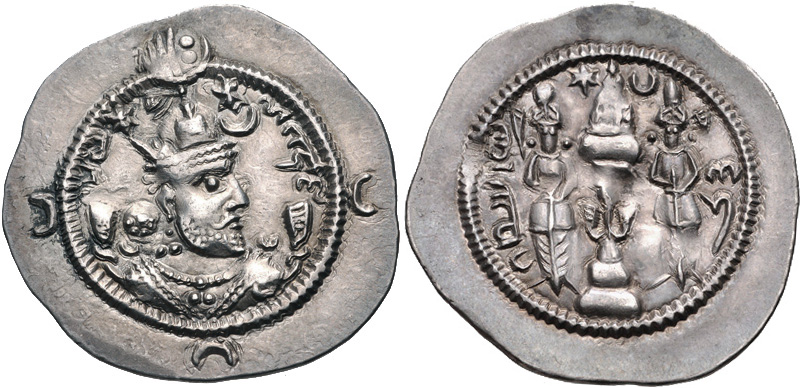
Silver coin depicting Khosrow I

In 576 the Byzantines had attained a significant victory over a Sasanian invasion led by Shahenshah Khosrow Anoushirvan at the Battle of Melitene, as a result of which they were able to invade into Persia as far as the Caspian Sea. However, in the following year their momentum was checked by Sasanian forces, led by Tamkhosrau, who routed a Byzantine army in Armenia with a surprise attack.

Exploiting this success, Sasanian forces led by the Marzban Adarmahan launched a counter-incursion into Byzantine Mesopotamia, ravaging the territory around Dara, Tell Basmaya and Rhesaina. Adarmahan then briefly invested the fortified settlement of Constantina, demanding its inhabitants to surrender to the Sasanians, but the garrison refused and Adarmahan was forced to raise the siege due to the approach of a Byzantine relief army led by the Magister Militum per Orientem Justinian.

These reversals of Byzantine fortunes in the war prompted Tiberius II to make a series of policy changes for the armies of the east. Tiberius dispatched Praetorian Prefect of the Orient Gregorius with sufficient resources and funds to restore the strength and morale of the troops, and as a result the fighting capability of the armies was restored. Noting that quarrels and lack of cooperation between the high command of the Byzantines had facilitated the recent Persian successes against them, Tiberius also made changes to military leadership. He dispatched Maurice to the east to replace Justinian as Magister Militum per Orientem, with a large number of men drawn from the western Byzantine armies alongside him, as reinforcements to the east. The historian Theophanes the Confessor noted that these included 15,000 Tiberiani, men of Germanic origin, enrolled at Constantinople and provided equipment from Byzantine factories. Maurice was given overall command over both the Mesopotamian and Armenian armies, so that command could be centralized under a single authority. In 578, while en route to his new command, Maurice mustered additional reinforcements by recruiting and drilling men from Cappadocia, before proceeding towards Citharizum, a strategic position from which Maurice intended to block Sasanian incursions into Mesopotamia.

== Campaign of 578 ==
=== Tamkhosrau's raid ===
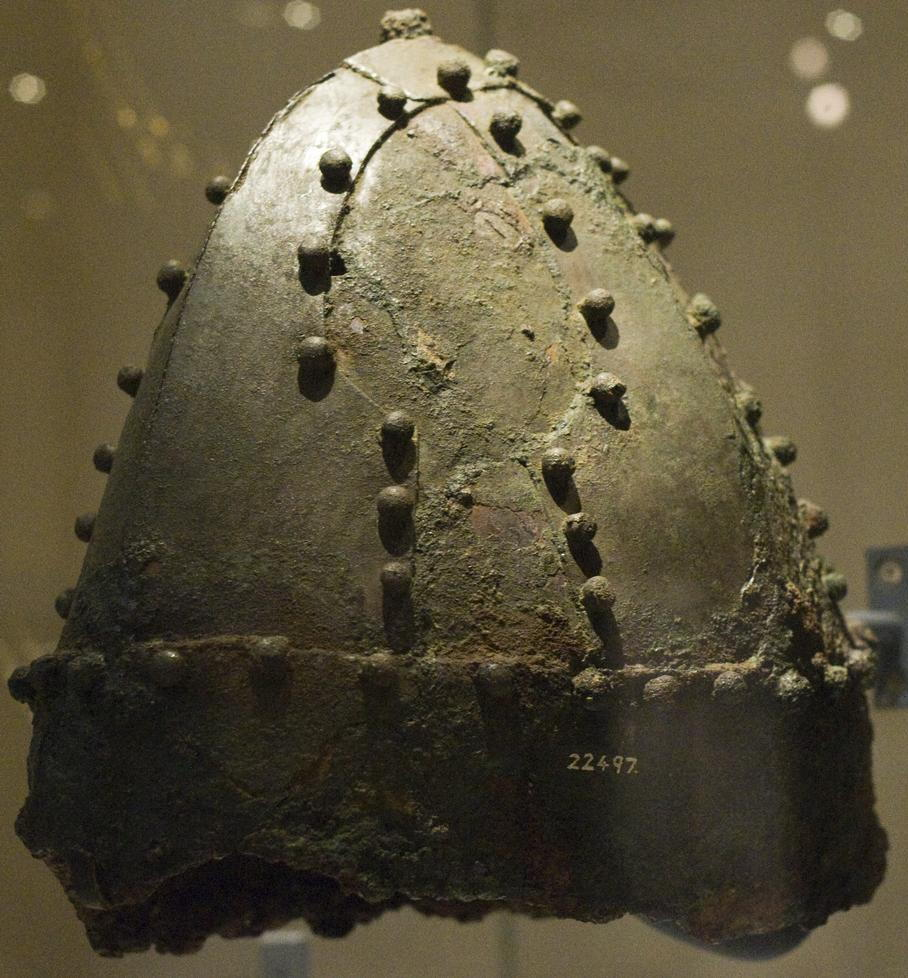
6th century Sasanian combat helmet

In early 578 Tamkhosrau devised a ruse to enable him to raid into Osroene, without having to face the larger Byzantine army under Maurice, which was stationed at Citharizum. He dispatched a letter to the Byzantines, challenging them to battle near Theodosiopolis, luring the inexperienced Maurice to leave his strategic position and march with his men towards the city. Tamkhosrau left his position at night, in order to fool the Byzantine scouts and advanced towards Sophene and then Martyropolis, pillaging the land surrounding the fortified cities, while destroying a number of monasteries. Tamkhosrau then marched to Amida, levelling the buildings outside the walls, before putting the city to siege. The Sasanians stormed Amida for three consecutive days, but the garrison repulsed each one of these attempts. Tamkhosrau was forced to lift the siege, and out of concern that Maurice's field army would come to Amida's aid, he retreated Arzanene, with a significant amount of plunder.

Despite suffering from a fever, Maurice led his army into Arzanene in an attempt to intercept Tamkosrau, upon receiving news of the Sasanian raid. However by the time the Byzantines reached the area, the more mobile Sasanian force had already eluded them and reached Persarmenia.

=== Maurice's offensives ===
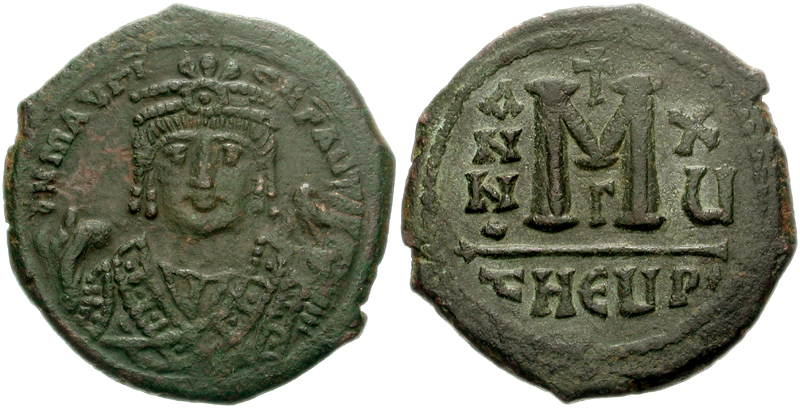
Follis of Maurice in consular uniform

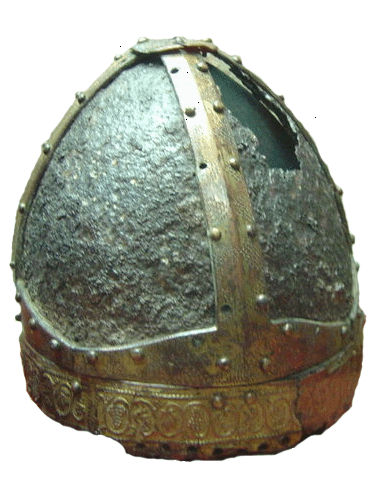
6th century Byzantine combat helmet

Enraged by his failure to intercept Tamkhosrau, Maurice resolved to wreak havoc upon Persian Arzanene in retaliation. As many of its inhabitants were Christian, Maurice dispatched messengers to the surrounding villages, ordering those who wished to live to surrender themselves and their goods to the Byzantine army within three days. According to Theophylact, 10,090 Christians from the region became captives of the invading Byzantines as a result, most of whom were settled in Cyprus after the campaign.

Maurice began full-scale military operations in Arzanene. The fortress of Aphumon and several other forts fell to Byzantine siege engines, after which the Byzantines invested the city of Arzun. After an intense siege and several assaults by the Byzantines, the inhabitants dispatched the local bishop Binganes to offer a ransom for the Byzantines to lift the siege. Maurice attempted to persuade the bishop to surrender the city by offering him wealth and a high position in Byzantium, but the latter refused. Consequently, Binganes was later arrested by the Byzantines. Eventually Maurice accepted a large ransom to spare the city and raise the siege, in order to continue his campaign.

Maurice split his army into two, delegating one section under Cours and Romanus to cross the Tigris and devastate its eastern bank, while his own division continued down its western side. After ravaging Arzanene, Maurice veered Southwards with the probable intention of intercepting the Sasanian commander Mahbod, who had conducted a counter-incursion towards Constantina with an army of 12,000 Persians and 8,000 Sabir Huns. Maurice marched into Beth Arabye, hoping to cut off Mahbod's route of retreat, taking the Sasanian-held fortress Thannuris and continuing up to the fortified settlement of Singara, which he conquered and destroyed. Having put Mahbod to flight and raided Sasanian lands, Maurice returned in triumph to Byzantine territory, where the division under Cours and Romanus reunited with him before winter. A passage from the historian Agathias relates that after the Byzantine invaders departed, the Shahenshah Khosrow I, returning to Ctesiphon from his summer residence in the Corduchean mountains in the final journey of his life, was able to witness personally the atrocities and desolation wrought on Sasanian territory.

== Campaign of 579 ==
=== Battle of Vanand ===
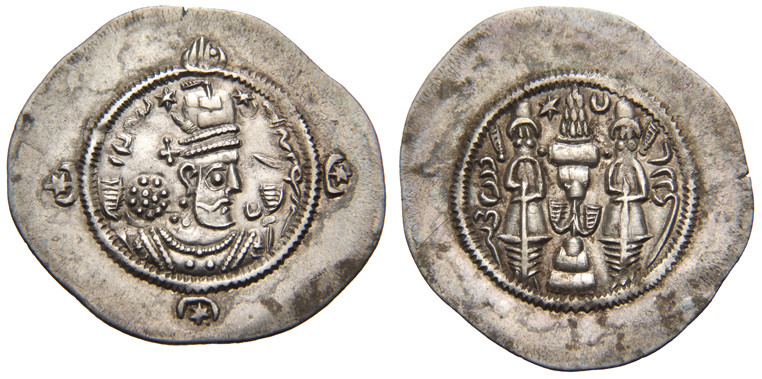
Silver coin depicting Hormizd IV

According to John of Ephesus, in 579 the Sasanians launched a counter-offensive against the Byzantines in Armenia. They mustered a force of supposedly 50,000 soldiers and placed it under the command of Varaz Vzur. The prospects of success appeared high, as the Byzantine forces in Armenia, under the command of John Mystacon and Cours, were in a state of mutiny, as the soldiers had not received their salaries. However, this crisis subsided when Tiberius dispatched a curator named Domentziolus to the east with sufficient funds to appease the men.

The Persians advanced into Armenia soon after, and dispatched a message to Cours, challenging him to bring his army to battle. The Byzantine forces at the time were divided, with Cours having only 20,000 men under his immediate command. The Byzantine commander thus employed a stratagem, discreetly preparing his men for combat while feigning weakness. When the Sasanians advanced and encamped in a locale at Vanand near his base, Cours led his men against them during the night. Cours' men stormed the Persian encampment, defeating its defenders and massacring the enemy within (many of whom were sleeping or not fully armed). Other than a small number who escaped, the Sasanian army was largely destroyed, while Varaz Vzur and his son were taken prisoners. Cours took large quantities of loot and horses from the Persian camp and retired to his base.

=== Invasion of Media ===
In 579, following the successes of the previous year's campaign, Maurice organized a more ambitious offensive which would carry the war into the Iranian Plateau. He dispatched the commanders Romanus, Theoderic and Martinus ahead into Media, and followed them with the main army. Exploiting the heavy Sasanian defeat at Vanand, as well as the death of Khosrow Anoushirvan in early 579, the Byzantine armies were able to plunder far and wide across northwestern Iran, taking several settlements and inflicting widespread devastation upon enemy territory. These victories encouraged Maurice to plan an even more ambitious invasion in the following year, with the intention of capturing the enemy capital of Ctesiphon.

== Campaign of 580 ==
=== Alamoundaros' victory ===
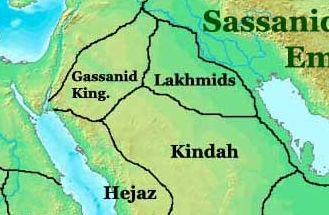
Ghassanids and Lakhmids

In late 579, the Ghassanid king Al-Mundhir III ibn al-Harith, known in Byzantine sources as Flavios Alamoundaros, visited Constantinople and received a royal crown and a number of gifts from Tiberius, while he also successfully advocated on behalf of his Monophysite co-religionists, resulting in a cessation of the imperial persecution of them. Tiberius sought to placate Alamoundaros with these policies, understanding the value of the Ghassanid Foederati during campaigns against the Sasanians.

Upon his return to the east, Alamoundaros was forced to respond to an attack on Ghassanid and Byzantine territories by a combined Sasanian-Lakhmid force, which had exploited his absence. Using his newly granted authority to assemble an army from local Byzantine units, as well as his own Ghassanid troops, Alamoundaros advanced to meet his enemies and soundly defeated them in a pitched battle.

=== Maurice's march on Ctesiphon ===
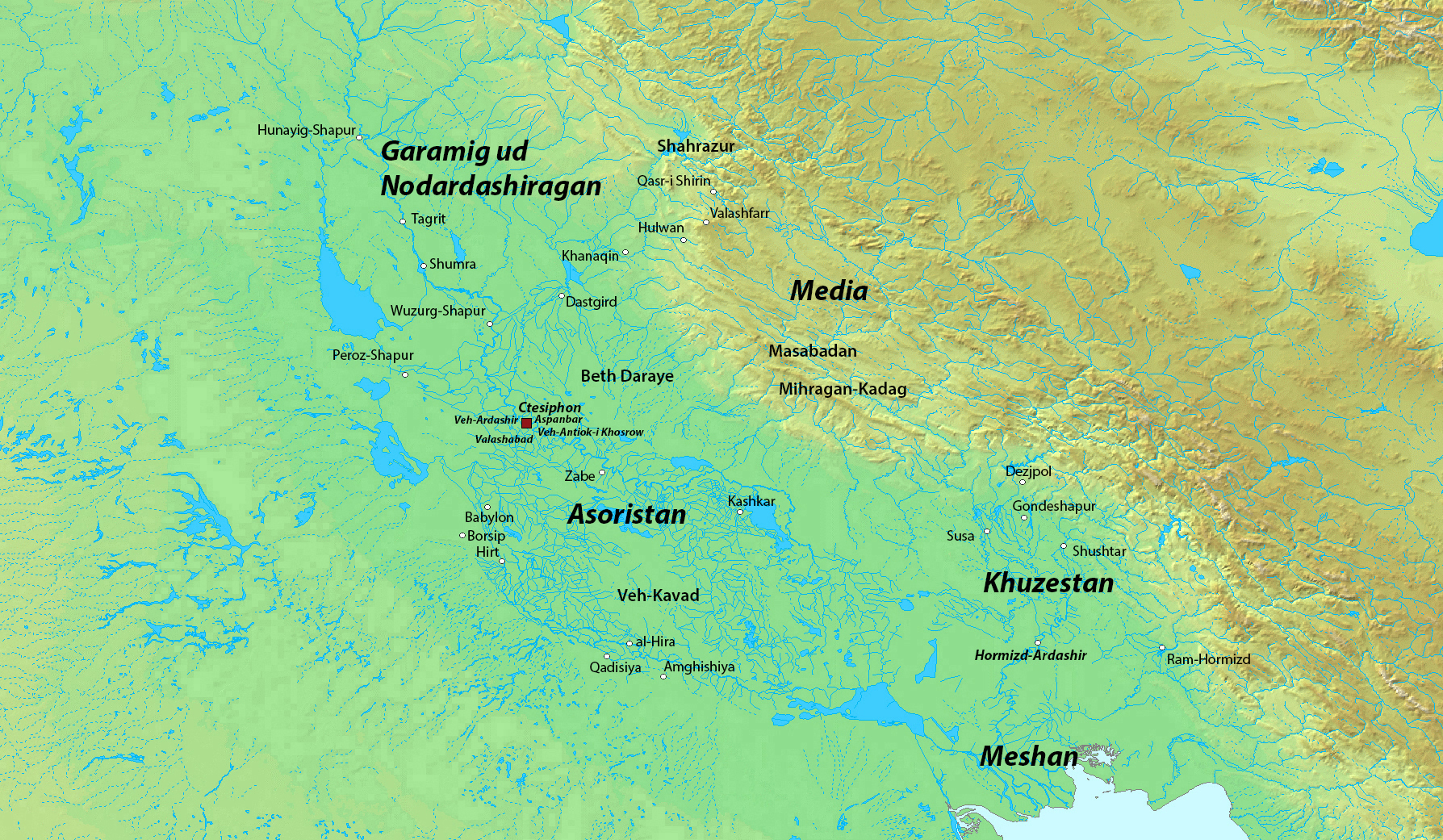
Southwestern part of the Sasanian Empire

In 580 Maurice organized a direct offensive along the eastern bank of the Euphrates into Lower Mesopotamia with the aim of capturing Ctesiphon. He intended to cross the bridge that existed over the Tigris to attack this location. To maintain this offensive logistically, the Byzantines had prepared a fleet of transport ships on the Euphrates, near Circesium, which would supply their men with grain. A second Byzantine army operated in Mesopotamia under the command of Alamoundaros and advanced against the Sasanian fortress of Anatha.

Maurice's army advanced with minimal resistance up to the bridge over the Tigris, only to discover that the Persians had demolished it in advance of the Byzantines. As the Byzantines were sophisticated in military engineering and experienced in fording rivers, it is unlikely that this alone halted their campaign as John of Ephesus claimed. The more likely reason for the abandonment of the offensive was the invasion of Upper Mesopotamia by Adarmahan, which threatened to cut off the Byzantine supply lines. (Note: Decker (p.192) proposes that the Sasanians stationed sufficient forces along the river to repel any potential fording attempts the Byzantines made)

Adarmahan had exploited the departure of forces under Maurice and attacked Byzantine possessions in Osroene, piercing far enough to imperil their crucial operating base at Callinicum and in turn, the entire Byzantine advance against Ctesiphon. Consequently, both Maurice and Alamoundaros were forced to turn back to drive out the Sasanian army threatening their rear. Prior to this, Alamoundaros' column had conducted an intense siege of Anatha, in which both sides sustained significant casualties from artillery, but upon receiving news of Adarmahan's attack, he was forced to lift the siege and turn back, though he pillaged Sasanian holdings en route.

Upon reaching Callinicum on a Saturday, Alamoundaros and his army met the Sasanians in a pitched battle and soundly defeated them, inflicting severe losses upon the Persians and driving them back to their camp. However, in a situation reminiscent of the Battle of Dara half a century before, Alamoundaros' army lacked the strength to storm the fortified encampment of the Persians and complete his victory. With his army nonetheless crippled, Adarmahan resorted to a stratagem to save the remnants of his men, exploiting the Christian practices of his enemy to reach an armistice on Sunday and postpone fighting for that day. According to the Chronicle of 1234, when night fell that Sunday, Adarmahan ordered lights of his camp to be lit while he and his army escaped into the darkness. It is possible that in addition to his defeat, the imminent arrival of the main Byzantine army under Maurice, far larger than the one under Alamoundaros, necessitated such an urgent retreat by Adarmahan.

=== Armenian Campaign ===
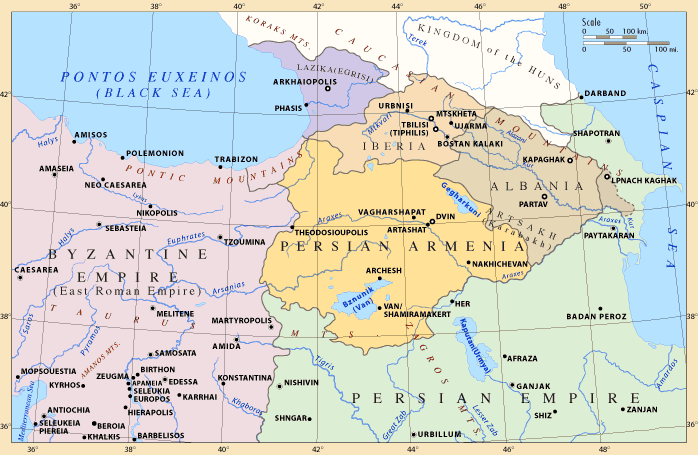
Sasanian Armenia

At the same time as Maurice advanced against Ctesiphon and Alamoundaros against Anatha, a third Byzantine army had conducted an offensive into Sasanian Armenia, with the aim of taking the administrative centre of the region, Dvin. The unknown commanders of this force appear to have disobeyed Maurice's orders and diverted the campaign northwards against Iberia instead of Dvin. However, this endeavour proved unsuccessful, as the Byzantines were ambushed and routed by Sasanian forces near Shirak, as recorded by Sebeos. Menander also attested to the failure of this campaign.

=== Sack of Al-Hira ===
In late 580 the Sasanians launched a punitive attack against the territories of Alamoundaros, with a force composed of Persian and Lakhmid troops. The Ghassanid king's scouts informed him of this incursion however, allowing him to collect local forces and intercept the enemy. Consequently, the assembled Byzantine-Ghassanid contingent ambushed and annihilated the invading column. The Phylarch exploited his victory by raiding Sasanian and Lakhmid territory along the Western bank of the Euphrates into Lower Mesopotamia. This campaign culminated with the capture and sack of Al-Hira, the Lakhmid capital, after which the Lakhmid king Al-Mundhir IV ibn al-Mundhir fell in battle. The successes of this campaign, as well as the previous exploits of Byzantine and Ghassanid forces under Alamoundaros, partially offset the otherwise poor results of the Byzantine offensives in 580.

== Sasanian counter-offensive of 581 ==
=== Byzantine-Ghassanid rift ===
Despite the cooperation between Maurice and Alamoundaros in forcing back Adarmahan's invasion, the strained relationship between them continued to thaw following the aborted offensive of 580. In particular, upon returning to Constantinople for the winter of 580-581, Maurice accused Alamoundaros of disobedience and treachery. Additionally, religious tension between the staunchly Chalcedonian Maurice and the Monophysite Alamoundaros further contributed to the thawing of relations between the two. Eventually, this culminated with the desertion of Alamoundaros' Ghassanid retinues before the critical engagement near Constantina, which in turn led to the arrest of Alamoundaros by the Byzantines in late 581.

=== Tamkhusrou's offensive ===
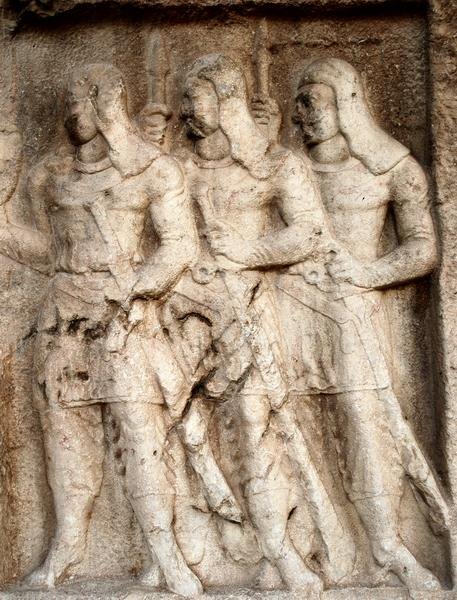
Sasanian infantry as depicted in the Bishapur relief

In early summer 581 the two Empires held peace negotiations near Dara, with Zacharias the Sophist representing the Byzantines and Andigan the Sasanians. Each side had their assembled armies stationed nearby to engage the enemy if negotiations were to fail, which they did. On this occasion the Sasanian Empire had mustered a very large army, more than 50,000 strong, by uniting forces from both the Armenian and Mesopotamian theatres. Tamkhusrou held overall command while Adarmahan served as his subcommander. The division within the enemy high command, namely the desertion of the forces under Alamoundaros, made the situation opportune and encouraged the Sasanians fight a decisive battle to regain the strategic initiative after the last three years of Byzantine ascendancy. Consequently, Tamkhusrou advanced against the Byzantine field army stationed on a plain near Constantina. However, Maurice and his men were prepared. In the ensuing pitched battle the Sasanian army was resoundingly defeated, with Tamkhusrou killed, along with three other high-ranking commanders. Adarmahan managed to escape the disaster. Although the battle stopped the major Sasanian offensive, the Byzantine victory was not strategically decisive, as enough of the Persian army had survived to continue the war in the following years.

Maurice did not attempt to exploit his success by leading another offensive into Sasanian territory, and instead remained in Osroene and reorganised the defences of the border. He remained in the area until July 582, after which he returned to Constantinople where the deterioration of Tiberius II's health made his presence necessary. Following the death of Tiberius, Maurice was crowned Emperor on August 5th.

== Result ==
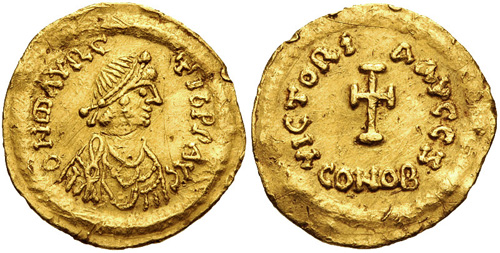
Solidus depicting Maurice

The overall result of Maurice's Sasanian campaigns was a Byzantine victory, as the Byzantines had gained a number of successes against the Sasanians and conducted offensives which had devastated their country and pillaged many fortresses and towns as far as Media. However the victory was a limited one, as the Sasanian Empire remained resilient despite its defeats, and the abandonment of the campaign against Ctesiphon in 580 demonstrated the limitations of Byzantine offensive capability. The battle of Constantina in 581 marked a clear success for Maurice, but this victory also proved strategically non-decisive, as the invading Persian army had not been destroyed altogether. The Sasanians had been worsted but not conclusively defeated by Maurice during his tenure as Magister Militum per Orientem, and thus the war against them continued into his reign as Emperor.

== Bibliography ==
- Whitby, Michael; Whitby, Mary (1986). The History of Theophylact Simocatta: An English Translation with Introduction. Oxford University Press.
- Whitby, Michael (1988). The Emperor Maurice and his Historian Theophylact Simocatta on Persian and Balkan Warfare. Clarendon Press. ISBN 978-0198229452.
- Martindale, J.R (1992). The Prosography of the Later Roman Empire A.D. 527-641, Volume IIIA. Cambridge University press. ISBN 978-0198229452.
- Syvänne, Ilkka (2022). The Military History of Late Rome AD 565-602. Pen and Sword. ISBN 978 1 47387 220 2.
- Greatrex, Geoffrey; Lieu, Samuel N. C. (2002), The Roman Eastern Frontier and the Persian Wars (Part II, 363–630 AD), Routledge, ISBN 978-0-415-00342-1
- Decker, Michael J. (2022). The Sasanian empire at War. Persia, Rome and the rise of Islam. Westholme Publishing, LLC. ISBN 978-1-59416-692-1.
- Goldsworthy, Adrian (2023). Rome and Persia: The Seven Hundred Year Rivalry. Basic Books. ISBN 978-1541619968.
