= Tamkhusrau's Armenian Campaign (577) =

- Part of Byzantine–Sasanian War of 572–591
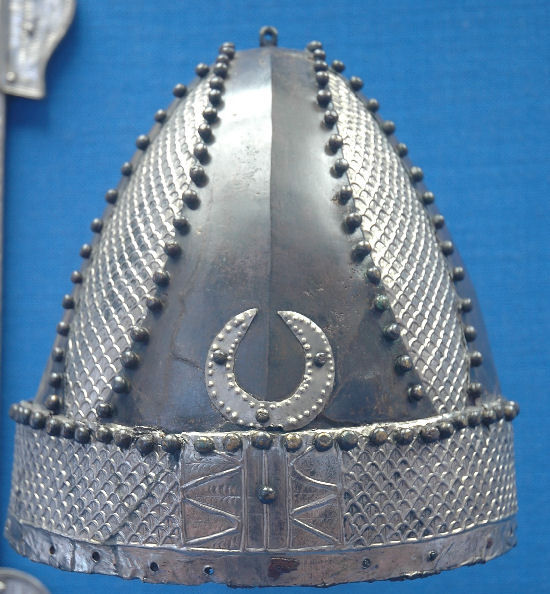
- Sasanian helmet, stored in Römisch-Germanisches Zentralmuseum.
Date	577
Location	Bagrevand, Armenia & Osrhoene
Result	Sasanian victory

Belligerents
Byzantine Empire	Sasanian Empire; Sasanian Armenia

Commanders and leaders
Justinian	Tamkhusrau; Adarmahan

Strength
50,000 at Bagrevand	Total: More than 50,000 in Armenia; 30,000 Persians; 20,000 Persarmenian reinforcements; Unknown number of troops under Adarmahan

Casualties and losses
Moderate to Heavy	Light

Tamkhusrau's Armenian Campaign was an offensive conducted by the Sasanian Empire against the Byzantines in Armenia. The Sasanian forces led by Tamkhusrau were successful and reincorporated large portions of Persarmenia back to Persian rule.

== Background ==
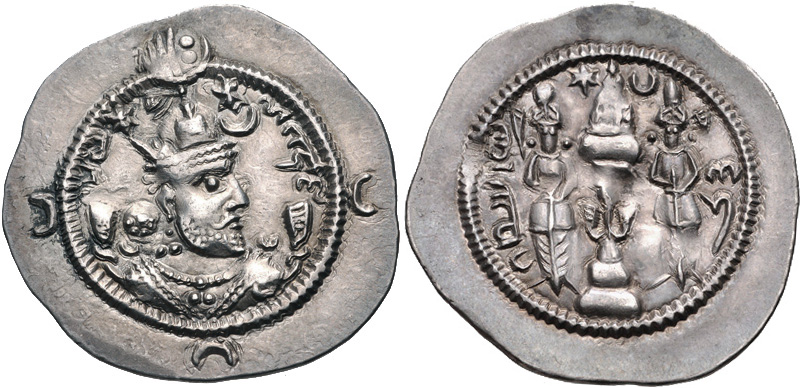
Silver coin depicting Khosrow I

In 576, the Sasanian Shahenshah Khosrow I had suffered a disastrous defeat at the Battle of Melitene, during an attempted invasion of Byzantine Anatolia. Following this success, the Byzantine commander Justinian launched an invasion of the Sasanian Empire in pursuit of Khosrow. Although the Shahenshah evaded capture, the Byzantines marched into Persian territory as far as the Iranian Plateau. Justinian then advanced toward the Caspian Sea and campaigned along its shores over the winter 576–577. In early 577, Justinian and his men returned in triumph to Armenia.

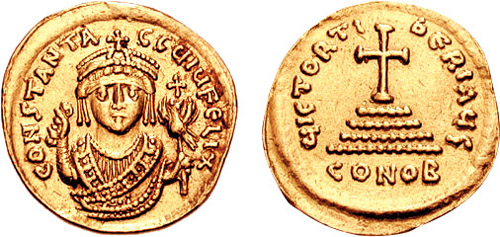
Solidus depicting Tiberius II

In light of these defeats and losses, Khosrow determined to enter negotiations with Byzantium in hopes of concluding an honourable peace, dispatching an envoy called Nadoes to Constantinople to initiate diplomacy. Caesar Tiberius accepted and sent his own envoys Theodorus, John, Peter, and court physician Zacharias, to the border in order to begin proceedings. Khosrow's representative, Mahbod Sarnachorganes, met them near Dara. The Persians initially demanded a return to the conditions of peace that had existed after the Lazic War, but under the circumstances the Byzantines rejected any treaty in which payment to Persia was expected. Consequently, the Sasanians agreed to rescind their demands for payment in exchange for the return of Persian territories taken by the Byzantines. A settlement on these lines was nearly concluded, before news of Tamkhusrou's exploits and the resulting change in strategic balance reached Ctesiphon.

== Battle of Bagrevand ==
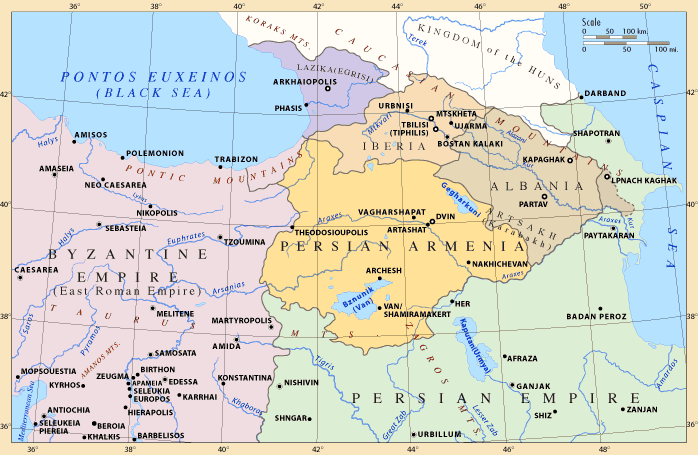
Sasanian Armenia

In 577, Tamkhusrau collected an army of 30,000, including elite cavalry, against Byzantine forces in Armenia. Though smaller than forces mustered in prior years, the historian Menander emphasised how Tamkhusrau had instilled rigid discipline within his ranks, and had prohibited unfit soldiers, non-combatant camp-followers and prostitutes from accompanying his army, as his aim was to move with speed and gain the element of surprise. In contrast, due to the series of successes they had attained in the previous years and the perceived end to the war, the already lax discipline of the Byzantine troops degraded as overconfidence led to a neglect of duty. Although the Byzantine army (likely around 50,000 men including servants) probably outnumbered Tamkhusrau's force, they were not in a state of battle-readiness. Justinian's men had encamped near Bagrevand without fortifying their position. The men had also neglected to equip themselves and had sent many of their horses to pasture.

John of Ephesus recorded that when the Byzantine scouts alerted them to the rapidly advancing enemy, the troops dismissed their alarm and ridiculed the idea that the Sasanians would advance to meet them after their prior victories over them. Consequently, when Tamkhusrou's host arrived (at a time when the Byzantine troops were eating their meals), Justinian's army was unprepared to face them. When they witnessed the battle order of Tamkhusrou's men approaching them fully equipped in organized ranks, the Byzantine army broke into a rout without attempting to resist the enemy. Those who managed to catch their horses fled on their backs, while the rest of the Byzantine soldiers routed on foot, throwing down their equipment and arms to run faster. The Sasanians conducted a brief, orderly pursuit, mocking the manner in which their enemy had fled before turning around to loot the scattered Byzantine equipment.

The victory of Tamkhusrau came as a surprise to the leadership of both states and restored Sasanian morale in the war. Consequently, the Sasanians broke off negotiation attempts and resolved to continue the war. The Byzantine ambassadors were dismissed and returned to Constantinople.

== Sasanian offensives ==
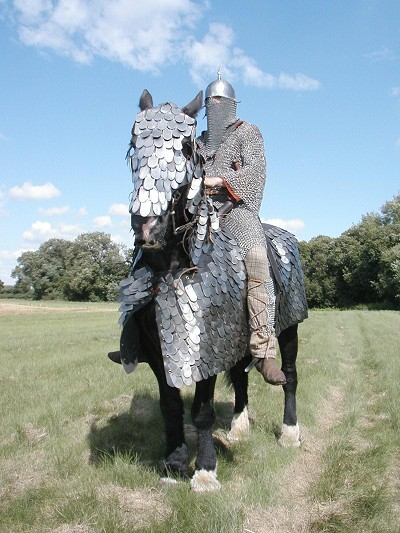
Historical re-enactment of a Sasanian cataphract

After the victory at Bagrevand, Sasanian forces led by the Marzban Adarmahan attacked Byzantine Osroene, ravaging the territories surrounding Dara, Tell Basmaya and Rhesaina. Adarmahan then led a short siege against the fortified settlement of Constantina, demanding its surrender, but the garrison refused and Adarmahan was forced to raise the siege upon hearing of the approach of a Byzantine relief army led by Justinian.

In Armenia, Tamkhusrou entered negotiations with numerous Armenian Nakharars, who had been incensed by the ravages inflicted upon their subjects by the armies of the Byzantines. When the Spahbod promised not harm them and to forgive all of their earlier transgressions against the Sasanians, almost the entirety of Armenia submitted to Persian rule. Consequently, Tamkhusrou's army was bolstered by 20,000 Persarmenian warriors in 577. According to Sebeos, Tamkhusrou exploited this, and Justinian's transferral of Byzantine forces southward against Adarmahan, to press further into Armenia. In a fierce battle at Bolorophak (near the confluence of the Araxes and Murtz rivers), Tamkhusrou achieved a second victory against the now outnumbered Byzantine army left behind by Justinian.

== Aftermath ==
The humiliating defeat at Bagrevand and other setbacks in Armenia which followed prompted Tiberius to reorganise the leadership structure of the Byzantine Empire's military in the east. Despite his success in relieving the siege of Constantina, Justinian was dismissed from his position as Magister Militum per Orientem, as the indiscipline of his troops had led to the defeat in Armenia. He was replaced with Maurice, under whom command over the entirety of the Byzantine armies of Armenia and Mesopotamia was united and offensive operations against the Sasanians soon resumed.

Tamkhusrau and Adarmahan continued to play important roles over the next years, conducting skilful diversionary attacks against Maurice's armies. In 581, the commanders united their armies for a major campaign in Mesopotamia, seeking a decisive victory against the Byzantines. However, in the ensuing Battle of Constantina, the Sasanians were defeated with severe losses. The veteran general Tamkhusrou was among the fallen.

== Bibliography ==
- Whitby, Michael; Whitby, Mary (1986). The History of Theophylact Simocatta: An English Translation with Introduction. Oxford University Press.
- Decker, Michael J. (2022). The Sasanian empire at War. Persia, Rome and the rise of Islam. Westholme Publishing, LLC. ISBN 978-1-59416-692-1.
- Syvänne, Ilkka (2022). The Military History of Late Rome AD 565-602. Pen and Sword. ISBN 978-1-5267-9395-9.
- Greatrex, Geoffrey; Lieu, Samuel N. C. (2002), The Roman Eastern Frontier and the Persian Wars (Part II, 363–630 AD), Routledge, ISBN 978-0-415-00342-1
