= 582 =

Calendar year

582 in various calendars
- Gregorian calendar: 582; DLXXXII
- Ab urbe condita: 1335
- Armenian calendar: 31; ԹՎ ԼԱ
- Assyrian calendar: 5332
- Balinese saka calendar: 503–504
- Bengali calendar: −12 – −11
- Berber calendar: 1532
- Buddhist calendar: 1126
- Burmese calendar: −56
- Byzantine calendar: 6090–6091
- Chinese calendar: 辛丑年 (Metal Ox); 3279 or 3072 — to — 壬寅年 (Water Tiger); 3280 or 3073
- Coptic calendar: 298–299
- Discordian calendar: 1748
- Ethiopian calendar: 574–575
- Hebrew calendar: 4342–4343
- Hindu calendars
- Vikram Samvat: 638–639
- Shaka Samvat: 503–504
- Kali Yuga: 3682–3683
- Holocene calendar: 10582
- Iranian calendar: 40 BP – 39 BP
- Islamic calendar: 41 BH – 40 BH
- Javanese calendar: 471–472
- Julian calendar: 582; DLXXXII
- Korean calendar: 2915
- Minguo calendar: 1330 before ROC 民前1330年
- Nanakshahi calendar: −886
- Seleucid era: 893/894 AG
- Thai solar calendar: 1124–1125
- Tibetan calendar: ལྕགས་མོ་གླང་ལོ་ (female Iron-Ox); 708 or 327 or −445 — to — ཆུ་ཕོ་སྟག་ལོ་ (male Water-Tiger); 709 or 328 or −444

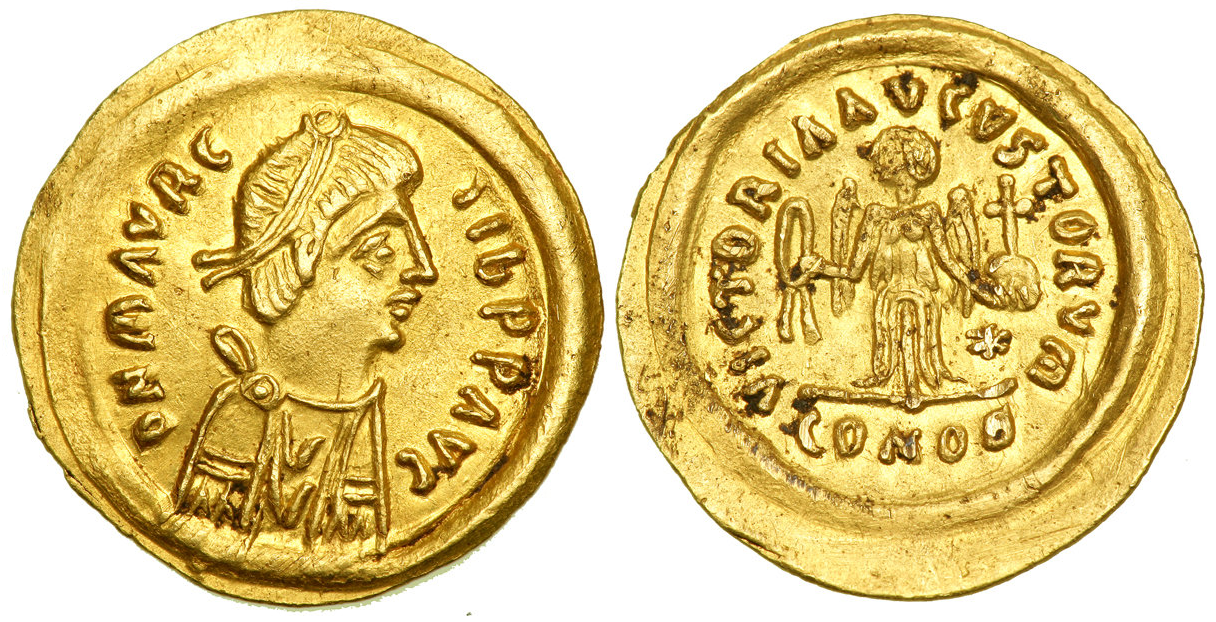
Emperor Maurice (582–602)

Year 582 (DLXXXII) was a common year starting on Thursday of the Julian calendar. The denomination 582 for this year has been used since the early medieval period, when the Anno Domini calendar era became the prevalent method in Europe for naming years.

== Events ==
=== By place ===
==== Byzantine Empire ====
- August 14 – Emperor Tiberius II Constantine, age 47, dies (possibly from deliberately poisoned food) at Constantinople, after a 4-year reign during which Thrace and Greece have been inundated by the Slavs. He is succeeded by his son-in-law Maurice, former notary who has commanded the Byzantine army in the war against the Persian Empire.
- Autumn – Maurice elevates John Mystacon to magister militum per Orientem. He sends a Byzantine expeditionary force to Arzanene (Armenia), where they fight a pitched battle at the river Nymphius (Batman River).

==== Europe ====
- Siege of Sirmium: The Avars, under their ruler (khagan) Bayan I, aided by Slavic auxiliary troops, capture the city of Sirmium after almost a 3-year siege. Bayan establishes a new base of operations within the Byzantine Empire, from which he plunders the Balkan Peninsula, including Athens.
- Gundoald, illegitimate son of Clotaire I, arrives with the financial support of Constantinople in southern Gaul. He claims as usurper king the cities Poitiers and Toulouse, part of the Frankish Kingdom (approximate date).
- The Visigoths under King Liuvigild capture the city of Mérida (western central Spain), which is under the political control of its popular bishop Masona. He is arrested and exiled for 3 years.

==== Persia ====
- A Persian army under Tamkhosrau crosses the Euphrates River and attacks the city of Constantina (modern Turkey), but he is defeated by the Byzantines and killed.

==== Asia ====
- Spring – Emperor Xuan of Chen, age 52, dies after a 13-year reign and is succeeded by his incompetent son Chen Shubao (Houzhu), who becomes the new ruler of the Chen dynasty.
- Emperor Wen of the Sui dynasty orders the building of a new capital, which he calls Daxing (Great Prosperity), on a site southeast of Chang'an (modern Xi'an).

=== By topic ===
==== Religion ====
- April 11 – John Nesteutes becomes the 33rd bishop or patriarch of Constantinople.

== Births ==
- Arnulf of Metz, Frankish bishop and saint (approximate date)
- Li Mi, Chinese rebel leader during the Sui dynasty (d. 619)

== Deaths ==
- April 5 – Eutychius, patriarch of Constantinople
- August 14 – Tiberius II Constantine, Byzantine Emperor
- Agathias, Greek poet and historian (approximate date)
- Ashina, empress of Northern Zhou (b. 551)
- Justinian, Byzantine general (magister militum)
- Tamkhosrau, Sassanid Persian general (marzban)
- Xuan Di, emperor of the Chen dynasty (b. 530)
