= Sack of Singara (578) =

Byzantine army siege on Sasanian-held city

- Part of the Byzantine–Sasanian War of 572–591 & Maurice's Sasanian Campaigns (578–581)
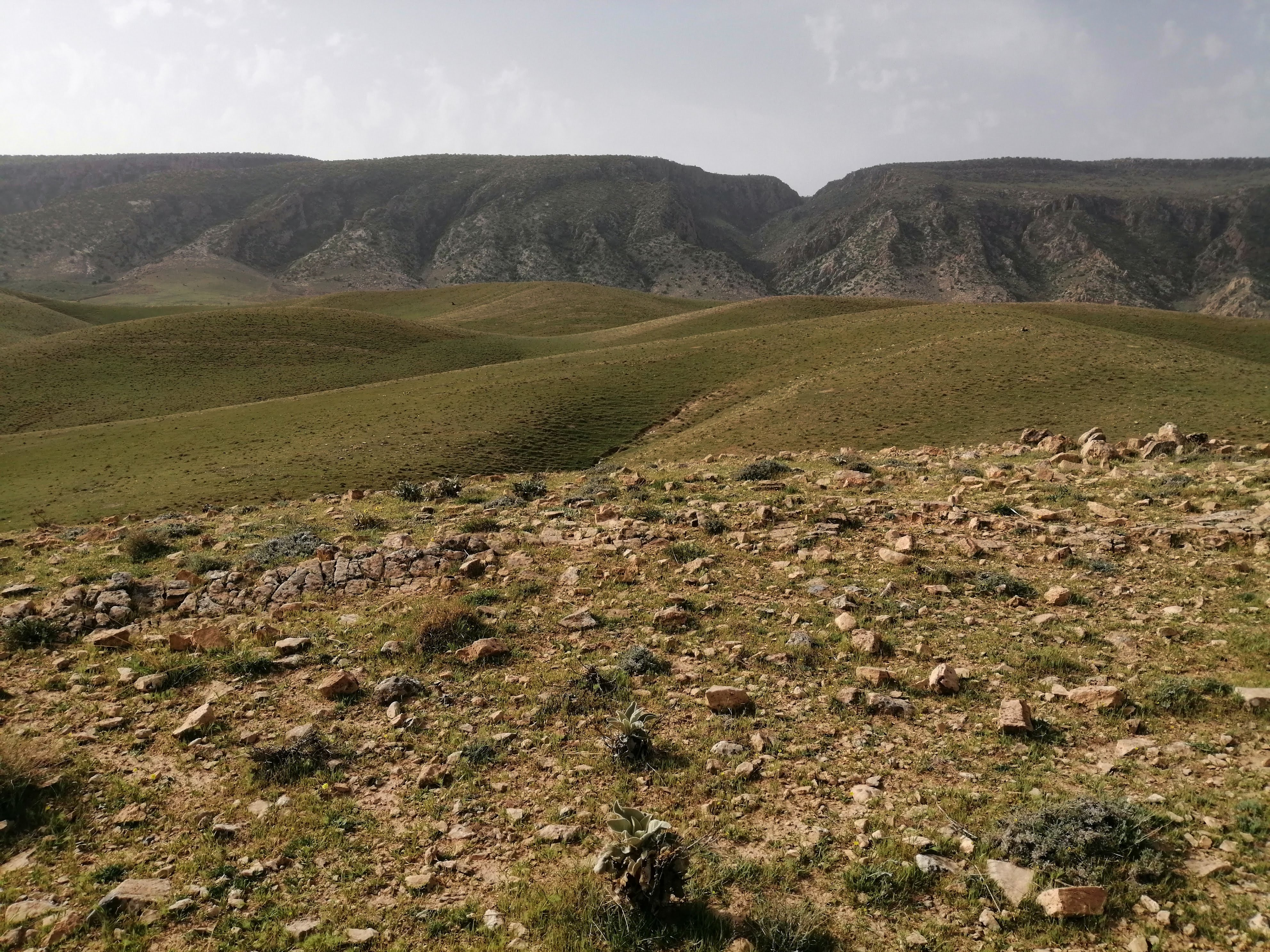
- Modern view of the Sinjar mountains
Date	578
Location	Singara, Mesopotamia
Result	Byzantine victory

Belligerents
Byzantine Empire	Sasanian Empire; Sabirs

Commanders and leaders
Maurice	Mahbod

Strength
Greater than the Sasanians	20,000 (Note: This was the strength of the army under Mahbod in 578. Mahbod withdrew from Singara, probably with many of his men, before Maurice arrived there. Therefore, the actual fighting strength of the Garrison, while unknown, was presumably less than 20,000 at the time Maurice besieged the settlement.): 12,000 Persians; 8,000 Sabir Huns

Casualties and losses
Unknown	Heavy; Singara destroyed

The Sack of Singara was an investment of the Sasanian-held city of Singara by the Byzantine army under the command of the general Maurice. The Byzantines took the city and destroyed it. This operation was conducted during Maurice's Sasanian Campaigns.

== Background ==
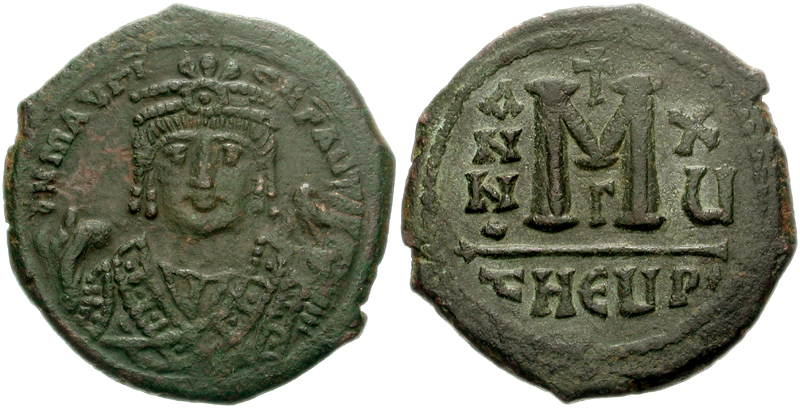
Follis of Maurice in consular uniform after he became Emperor in 582

In 578, the newly appointed magister militum per Orientem, Maurice, invaded Sasanian territory in Mesopotamia, in retaliation for a raid on Byzantine territory by Tamkhosrow earlier that year. After a highly successful and destructive attack against Arzanene, Maurice split his army into two. He delegated one portion to his subcommanders, Cours and Romanus, who crossed the Tigris and devastated its eastern bank, while his own division progressed south with the likely intention of intercepting the Sasanian commander Mahbod (who had conducted a counter-incursion towards Constantina) and his army.

== Sack of Singara ==
Maurice marched his own division into Beth Arabye, probably in pursuit of Mahbod, first capturing Sasanian-held Thannuris and then pillaging the region up to the fortified settlement of Singara. Theophylact provided a description of this position in the late 6th century. Singara was heavily fortified and the lack of water sources in its vicinity made it difficult for a besieging army to support itself.

In spite of these imposing defences, Mahbod appears to have withdrawn from Singara before the arrival of the Byzantines, fearing besiegement there by the larger Byzantine army, while possibly also having problems in sustaining his own army in the region. Maurice's men then defeated the Sasanian garrison left behind in a siege and captured Singara. The contemporary historian Menander detailed the sophisticated siege techniques employed by the Byzantine armies during the campaign, noting their expertise in constructing walls of circumvallation, mining operations, and extensive use of artillery. Following their victory, the Byzantines ravaged and destroyed the settlement. Maurice returned in triumph to Byzantine territory for the winter, after the successful campaigns of 578.

== Bibliography ==
- Whitby, Michael; Whitby, Mary (1986). The History of Theophylact Simocatta: An English Translation with Introduction. Oxford University Press.
- Syvänne, Ilkka (2022). The Military History of Late Rome AD 565-602. Pen and Sword. ISBN 978 1 47387 220 2.
- Greatrex, Geoffrey; Lieu, Samuel N. C. (2002), The Roman Eastern Frontier and the Persian Wars (Part II, 363–630 AD), Routledge, ISBN 978-0-415-00342-1
