= Circesium =

Former populated place in Syria

- Location within Syria Location within Near East
- 35°09′21″N 40°25′48″E
- Location: Syria
- Region: Deir ez-Zor Governorate

Site notes
- Length: 540 m (1,770 ft)
- Width: 190 m (620 ft)

Circesium (Classical Syriac: ܩܪܩܣܝܢ Qerqesīn, Ancient Greek: Κιρκήσιον), known in Arabic as al-Qarqisiya, was a Roman fortress city near the junction of the Euphrates and Khabur rivers, located at the empire's eastern frontier with the Sasanian Empire. Procopius calls it the "farthest fortress" (φρούριον ἔσχατον) of the Romans. It was later conquered by the Muslim Arabs in the 7th century and was often a point of contention between various Muslim states due to its strategic location between Syria and Iraq. The modern town of al-Busayra corresponds with the site of Circesium.

== Etymology and location ==
The name Circesium or castrum Circense is of Graeco-Roman origin and translates as "the castle with the circus". Qerqusion (also spelled Qarqūsyōn) and al-Qarqīsiyā (also spelled 'Qarqīsīā) are the Syriac and Arabic versions of the Latin name, respectively. The Parthian transliteration, attested in Shapur I's inscription at the Ka'ba-ye Zartosht, is Krksyʾ. The etymology of the name was known to the medieval Muslim geographer, Hamza al-Isfahani, who wrote al-Qarqīsiyā stemmed from qirqīs, the Arabicized form of "circus". The ancient site was situated at the eastern bank of the Euphrates River, adjacent to the confluence of the Khabur River.

== History ==
=== Antiquity ===
A Roman military station likely existed in this location as early as 256 AD as the place is listed in King Shapur I's (r. 240–270) inscription at the Ka'ba-ye Zartosht, among towns taken from the Romans in 256 during the second Roman campaign. Later, having reverted to Roman hands, Emperor Diocletian (r. 284–286) further enforced Circesium into a strongly fortified outpost on the far eastern frontier of the empire, in order to improve the defensive capabilities against the Sasanians. Circesium was ceded to the Sasanids by Emperor Jovian (r. 363–364) in a treaty signed in 363.

In early 363, during his ill-fated Sasanian campaign, Emperor Julian (r. 361–363) moved through Circesium and crossed the Khabur River by using a pontoon bridge. According to contemporary sources, the cenotaph of Emperor Gordian III (who had been killed during his own Sasanian campaign of 244), was still visible at Zaitha (which was located nearby Circesium) when Julian and his army moved through the area.

It was again restored to the Romans and according to the Notitia Dignitatum, Circesium was the headquarter of Legio IV Parthica until the 5th century. The fortress of Circenium was restored and extended by Emperor Justinian I (r. 527–565) during his efforts "to reorganize the system of border protection at the beginning of his reign". Joseph Wiesehöfer / Encyclopædia Iranica notes that this might have been one of the reasons why Sasanian King Khosrow I (r. 531–579), during his offensive in 540, decided to invade the Roman Empire further to the north, "along the western bank of the Euphrates". Circesium, due to these reorganization efforts by Justinian I, eventually became the garrison site of a dux.

In 573, during Khosrow I's offensive during the Byzantine–Sasanian War of 572–591, the Sasanian Shahenshah ordered the general Adarmahan to cross the Euphrates near Circesium in order to attack the eastern Byzantine provinces from there. In 580, Circesium was turned into the garrison base for Emperor Maurice's offensive during the Byzantine–Sasanian War of 572–591. During the flight of Khosrow II (r. 590–628) in 590 from Sasanian territory during the rebellion of Bahram Chobin, he was briefly sheltered by the Byzantine garrison commander of Circesium, Probus, before moving to Hierapolis.

=== Medieval era ===
During the Muslim conquests, Circesium was captured from the Byzantines without resistance by a Muslim army commanded by Habib ibn Maslama al-Fihri, himself dispatched by the Muslim governor of Jazira (Upper Mesopotamia), Iyad ibn Ghanm. Though many Muslim sources state this occurred in 637, it more likely occurred in 640. According to Joseph Wiesehöfer / Encyclopædia Iranica, in all likelihood, Circesium was recaptured shortly after by the Byzantines. However, in 690-691, during the reign of Caliph Abd al-Malik ibn Marwan (r. 685–705), Circesium became a definitive part of the Umayyad Caliphate. The city afterward became the capital of the Khabur district of the Jazira province. During the Second Muslim Civil War, Circesium became the headquarters of the Qaysi tribal leader Zufar ibn al-Harith al-Kilabi who recognized the caliphate of Abd Allah ibn al-Zubayr in rebellion against the Umayyads. Abd al-Malik was forced to contend with Zufar before he could embark on his conquest of Iraq from the Zubayrids. To that end, he besieged Circesium around 690 and after several months, Zufar ultimately surrendered and defected to the Umayyads.

In the late 9th century, the autonomous governor of Egypt, Ahmad ibn Tulun, extended his domains as far as Circesium, but the Abbasids under al-Muwaffaq recaptured it in 881. The city, alongside nearby al-Rahba, played an important role in the struggles involving the Hamdanids who ruled the Jazira autonomously during the 10th century. According to Istakhri and Ibn Hawqal, al-Qarqīsiyā/al-Qarqīsīā (Circesium) was a flourishing city as late as the 10th century. In 1265, the Mamluk sultan Baybars captured Circesium from the Mongols, massacring its Mongol and Georgian garrison. However, the fortified city was back in Mongol hands by 1281. Due to its strategic location, Muslim geographers throughout the Islamic era mentioned Circesium but gave no detailed account of the city in their descriptions of the region. This may indicate that Circesium did not become a large town under the various Muslim dynasties that ruled it.

=== Modern era ===
The site of Circesium is today occupied by the town of al-Busayra. Writing in the early 20th century, historian M. Streck wrote that al-Busayra was a village of thirty to forty clay houses adjacent to a large site of ruins.

== Bishopric ==
The bishopric of Circesium was a suffragan of Edessa, the capital of the Roman province of Osrhoene.

A Nestorian writer says that a Bishop Jonas of this see was one of the participants at the First Council of Nicaea (325) who had suffered mutilation during the preceding persecution. However, his name does not appear in the authentic list. Abrahamius, took part in the Council of Chalcedon in 451 and was a signatory of the joint letter that the bishops of the province of Osrhoene sent to Byzantine Emperor Leo I the Thracian in 458 regarding the murder of Patriarch Proterius of Alexandria. Nonnus was a supporter of Severus of Antioch and was expelled by Emperor Justin I in 518. He also acted as a representative of the Monophysites at a conference held in Constantinople in 532. Davithas (David) was a member of the council called by Patriarch Menas of Constantinople in 536, and Thomas was at the Second Council of Constantinople in 553. Michael the Syrian lists fourteen Jacobite bishops of the see, apart from Nonnus, the last being of the 11th century.

No longer a residential bishopric, Circesium is today listed by the Catholic Church as a titular see.

== Bibliography ==
- Amitai-Preiss, Reuven (1995). Mongols and Mamluks: The Mamluk-Ilkhanid War, 1260-1281. Cambridge: Cambridge University Press. ISBN 0-521-46226-6.
- Streck, M. (1978). "Karkisiya". In van Donzel, E.; Lewis, B.; Pellat, Ch. & Bosworth, C. E. (eds.). The Encyclopaedia of Islam, Second Edition. Volume IV: Iran–Kha. Leiden: E. J. Brill. pp. 654–655. ISBN 978-90-04-05745-6. OCLC 758278456.
- Wiesehöfer, Joseph (1991). "CIRCESIUM". Encyclopaedia Iranica, Vol. V, Fasc. 6. pp. 595–596.
