= Battle of Constantina =

- Part of Byzantine–Sasanian War of 572–591 & Maurice's Sasanian Campaigns (578–581)
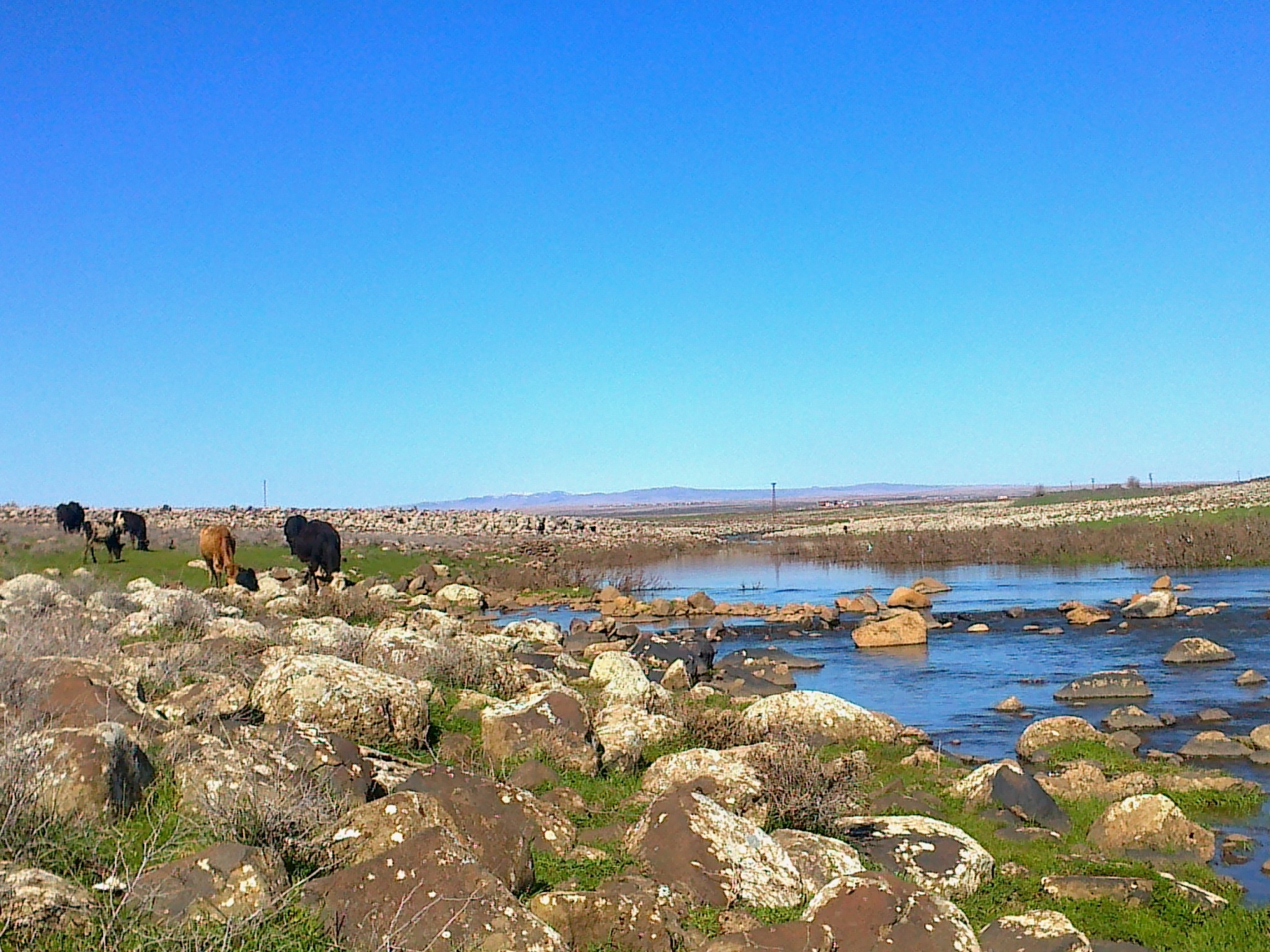
- Modern view of the countryside near Viranşehir, near to where the battle was fought
Date	June 581 or 582
Location	Constantina, Osrhoene near modern Viranşehir
Result	Byzantine victory

Belligerents
Byzantine Empire	Sasanian Empire

Commanders and leaders
Maurice; Theoderic; Constantine †	Tamkhosrau †; Adarmahan

Strength
Similar in strength to the Sasanians	More than 50,000

Casualties and losses
Light	Four generals and many thousands of soldiers killed

The Battle of Constantina or Battle of Monocarton was a victory won by the Byzantines under the general Maurice against the Sasanians under Tamkhosrau, near the town of Constantina, modern Viranşehir.

== Background ==
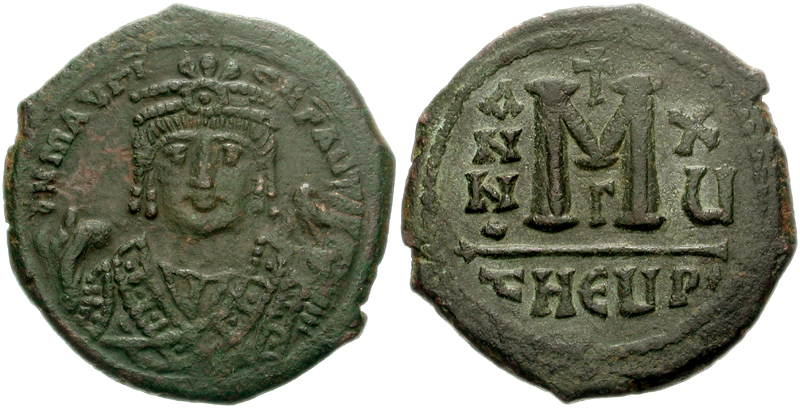
Follis of Maurice in consular uniform after he became Emperor in 582

In 577, Maurice was appointed magister militum per Orientem and took command of the ongoing war against the Sasanian Empire, wherein the Byzantines had recently suffered a series of setbacks against the resurgent Persian armies. Despite a lack of military experience, Maurice managed to restore Byzantine fortunes by conducting two highly successful offensives against the Sasanian in 578 and 579. However, the most recent campaign, an ambitious third offensive in 580, which had aimed at the Sasanian capital of Ctesiphon, had culminated unsuccessfully for the Byzantines. Furthermore, problems arose with the Ghassanid allies of the Byzantines, due to the breakdown of relations between Maurice and Alamoundaros, resulting in disobedience or even desertion by the Ghassanid retinues in 581. The absence of Alamoundaros, who had won several successes for the Byzantines in 580, emboldened the Sasanians to adopt a more aggressive strategy in 581.

== Battle ==
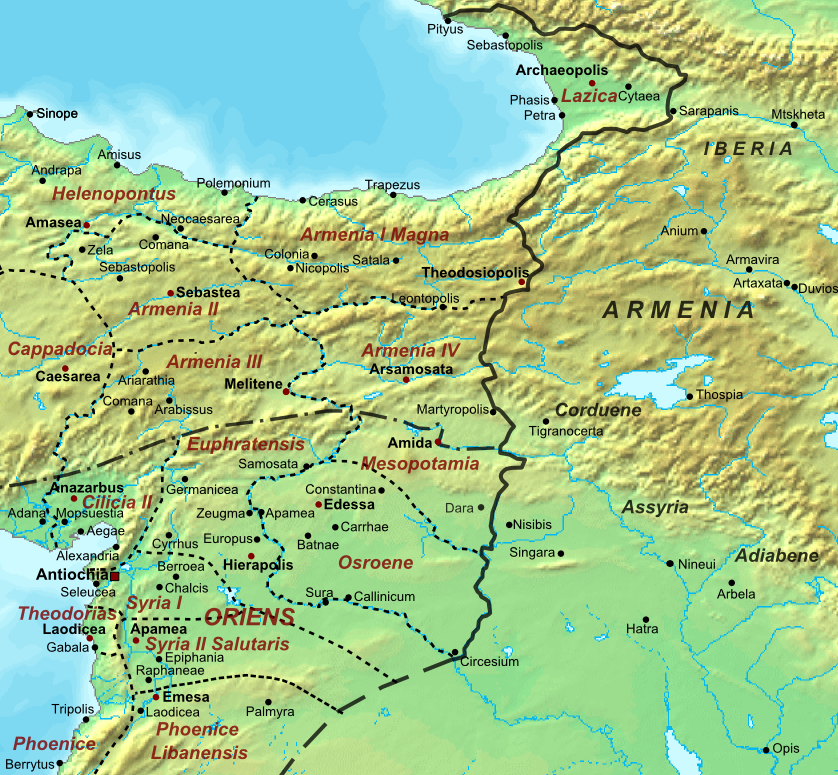
Roman-Sasanian frontier in 565, Dara and Constantina are visible in Mesopotamia and Osroene

In summer 581 the two Empires held peace negotiations near Dara, with Zacharias the Sophist representing the Byzantines and Andigan the Sasanians. Both parties brought Christian representatives to ease the negotiations, with the Sasanians bringing the Bishop of Nisibis, and the Byzantines the Bishop of Constantina. Each side had their assembled armies stationed nearby to engage the enemy if negotiations were to fail, which they did. On this occasion the Sasanians had mustered a large force, likely numbering more than 50,000 strong by combining separate armies previously commanded by Adarmahan and other generals. The veteran Spahbod, Tamkhosrau, held overall command, while Adarmahan served as his subcommander. Additionally the locale of the area, largely consisting of open plains with sufficient supply of water from rivers, was well suited to cavalry manoeuvres, in which the Sasanians excelled.

During the negotiations, Andigan asserted that the Byzantines would have to resume payments of tribute to the Shahenshah for any agreement to be reached. He also attempted to pressure Zacharias by highlighting Sasanian knowledge of the strategic difficulties faced by the Byzantines on other fronts of their Empire, while drawing attention to massive army under Tamkhosrau, stationed in full battle-readiness nearby. The Byzantines could not accept such humiliating terms. Consequently, the negotiations failed and the Sasanians resolved to fight the Byzantines, advancing to meet them at Constantina.

Though forced onto the defensive and probably slightly outnumbered, Maurice had also prepared for a direct engagement. Before the battle began, a Byzantine officer named Constantine had captured a Sasanian scout, who was forced to reveal the disposition of the Sasanian army, its battle order and the position of its commanders. Consequently, Maurice was able to prepare a counter-formation against Tamkhosrau's attack. As they had time to prepare the field of battle, the Byzantines may have also dug trenches, in a similar manner as they had done at the Battle of Dara 50 years earlier, though this is not directly mentioned in the primary sources.

A passage from Evagrius Scholasticus describing an unnamed battle, in which Maurice defeated Adarmahan, mentions the presence of a certain Theoderic, likely a Comes Foederatorum in Maurice's army. (Note: this passage is sometimes connected with the battle of Callinicum in 580, but Syvänne (2022, p.332) reasons it is likelier a description of the battle of Constantina) Theoderic supposedly gave way under pressure from Tamkhosrau's division, fleeing in a cowardly manner, though it is more likely that this was a planned feigned flight to draw the Sasanian commander and his elite cavalry out of position, to where the Byzantine reserves could assail his division. During the fighting, Tamkhosrau was killed, either by an unknown soldier as Menander records or, as John of Ephesus described, by the officer Constantine, who was himself killed in the fighting soon after transfixing the Spahbod with his lance. Following the death of Tamkhosrau, his division was enveloped by the Byzantines and annihilated, while the rest of the Persian line collapsed into a rout, with many thousands of their soldiers and three other wing commanders being killed by Maurice's men.

== Aftermath ==
Despite suffering severe losses to his own contingent, Adarmahan had managed to escape, making him the only leading figure on the Persian side to survive the battle. He regrouped what remained of the Sasanian army near the river Bethvashi and encamped there for three months, before retreating to the Persian heartland. Maurice, satisfied with the results of his resounding victory, did not attempt to pursue and annihilate the desperate enemy, nor conduct a further invasion of Sasanian territory. The Byzantine victory at Constantina was thus not decisive, as survivors of the Sasanian army remained a threat, though their offensive had been thoroughly checked in the short-term. Nevertheless, the loss of the highly experienced Tamkhosrau, architect of many successful operations in prior years, was a blow to the Sasanians.

Maurice remained in Osroene until July 582 and made efforts to bolster and reorganise the defences in the region. Thereafter, the decline of Tiberius II's health necessitated a return journey from the east to Constantinople. Following the death of Tiberius, Maurice was crowned as Emperor on August 5th. The victory at Constantina, which served as a climax for Maurice's successful campaigning years of 578-581, likely contributed to his reputation as a leader and in turn to his ascension as Augustus.

== Bibliography ==
- Martindale, J.R (1992). The Prosography of the Later Roman Empire A.D. 527-641, Volume IIIA. Cambridge University press. ISBN 978-0-19-822945-2.
- Whitby, Michael; Whitby, Mary (1986). The History of Theophylact Simocatta: An English Translation with Introduction. Oxford University Press.
- Whitby, Michael (1988). The Emperor Maurice and his Historian Theophylact Simocatta on Persian and Balkan Warfare. Clarendon Press. ISBN 978-0-19-822945-2.
- Syvänne, Ilkka (2022). The Military History of Late Rome AD 565-602. Pen and Sword. ISBN 978-1-5267-9395-9.
- Syvänne, Ilkka (2024). Late Roman Combat Tactics. Pen and Sword. ISBN 978 1 47387 220 2.
- Greatrex, Geoffrey; Lieu, Samuel N. C. (2002), The Roman Eastern Frontier and the Persian Wars (Part II, 363–630 AD), Routledge, ISBN 978-0-415-00342-1
- Decker, Michael J. (2022). The Sasanian empire at War. Persia, Rome and the rise of Islam. Westholme Publishing, LLC. ISBN 978-1-59416-692-1.
