= Fifty-Year Peace Treaty =

562 treaty between the Byzantine and Sassanid Empires

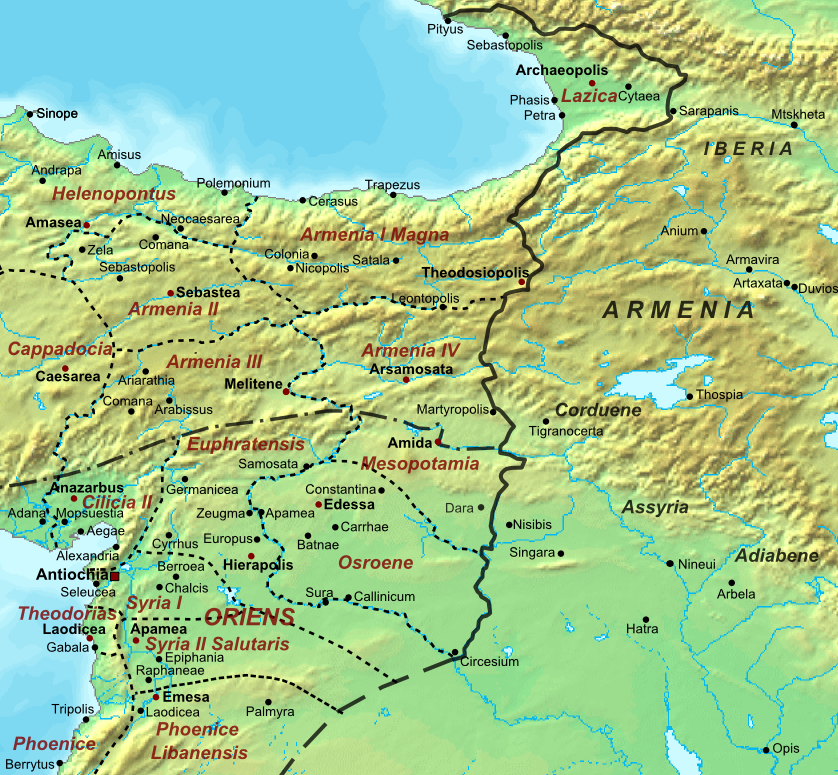
The Byzantine-Sassanid frontier in the Caucasus and Asia Minor at the time of Justinian's death in 565.

The Treaty of Dara, also known as the Fifty-Year Peace, was a peace treaty concluded between the Byzantine (Eastern Roman) and Sassanid (Persian) empires at the frontier town of Dara in what is now southern Turkey in 562. The treaty, negotiated by Peter the Patrician for the Byzantine emperor Justinian I and Izadgushasp for the Sassanid king Khosrau I ended the 20-year-long war over the Caucasian kingdom of Lazica. The treaty contained 13 articles, and is well-recorded. It covered all parts of the two empires, Persarmenia, Lazica, the client states, and the Arab allies.

The Sassanids undertook to evacuate Lazica, but the status of the neighboring country of Suania was left unclear to become a future source of disagreement. The Sassanids were to receive an annual subsidy of 30,000 gold nomismata, with the first seven years payable immediately. The expenses of the defense lines in the Caucasus against the nomads in the north, for which there was a mutual interest and had been the responsibility of the Sasanians, were included in the payments. Both sides agreed not to establish new fortifications or fortify the existing settlements on the border. To prevent spying, trade was restricted to Callinicum, Nisibis, and Dvin, while traders from other nations were restricted to Dara (under the Byzantines) and Nisibis (under the Sasanians). Refugees were free to return to their homes. In a separate treaty, the Christians in the Sasanian Empire were promised freedom of religion.

Although the war itself had ended inconclusively, the Sasanians were in a slightly better position because the Romans were forced to pay them an annual fixed sum.

The peace treaty was to last for 50 years, but it remained in effect only until 572, when Justin II broke the treaty after years of increased tensions at multiple fronts, initiating the war of 572–591. Among ancient sources, Menander Protector and Theophylaktos Simokattes blame Justin II, while Theophanes of Byzantium disagrees.
