= Macedonius of Thessalonica =

Macedonius of Thessalonica or Macedonius Consul (Greek: Μακηδόνιος or Μακεδόνιος Ύπατος, ο Θεσσαλονικεύς, c. 500-560 AD) was a Byzantine hypatos during the reign of Justinian, and the author of 42 epigrams in the Greek Anthology, the best of which are some delicate and fanciful amatory pieces. His poems were published in 567 AD by Agathias in his collection of contemporary epigrams, the "Kyklos".
