= Byzantine–Sasanian War of 572–591 =

War between the Sasanian Empire of Persia and the Eastern Roman Empire

Byzantine–Persian War over Armenia
- Part of Byzantine–Sasanian Wars
- Map of the Byzantine–Sasanian frontier, including the long-standing borders of 387 and the Byzantine gains of 591
Date	572–591
Location	Mesopotamia, Caucasus, Syria
Result	Byzantine victory
Territorial changes	Khosrow II gives the Byzantine Empire most of Persian Armenia and western half of Iberia after the Sasanian civil war of 589–591

Belligerents
Byzantine Empire; Ghassanids; Mamikonians; Huns; Supporters of Khosrow II	Sasanian Empire; Kingdom of Iberia (until 580); Lakhmids; Sabir Huns

Commanders and leaders
Justin II # Tiberius II # Maurice; Khosrow II; Marcian; Justinian; Flavios Alamoundaros; Cours; Romanus; John Mystacon; Philippicus; Comentiolus; Narses; Vistahm; Vinduyih; Musel II Mamikonian; Apsich; Theoderic; Martinus	Khosrow I # Hormizd IV X Bahram Chobin X Bacurius III # Al-Mundhir IV ibn al-Mundhir †; Al-Nu'man III ibn al-Mundhir; Tamkhosrau †; Adarmahan; Varaz Vzur (POW); Kardarigan; Izadgushasp; Fariburz; Bahram Gushnasp; Mahbod †; Farhad †; Binganes

The Byzantine–Sasanian War of 572–591 was a war fought between the Sasanian Empire of Persia and the Byzantine Empire. It was triggered by pro-Byzantine revolts in areas of the Caucasus under Persian hegemony, although other events also contributed to its outbreak. The fighting was largely confined to the southern Caucasus and Mesopotamia, although it also extended into eastern Anatolia, Syria, and northern Iran. It was part of an intense sequence of wars between these two empires which occupied the majority of the 6th and early 7th centuries. It was also the last of the many wars between them to follow a pattern in which fighting was largely confined to frontier provinces and neither side achieved any lasting occupation of enemy territory beyond this border zone. It preceded a much more wide-ranging and dramatic final conflict in the early 7th century.

== Outbreak of war ==
Less than a decade after the Fifty-Year Peace Treaty of 562, tensions mounted at all points of intersection between the two empires' spheres of influence, as had happened before when war broke out in the 520s. In 568–569, the Byzantines were engaged in ultimately abortive negotiations (cf. the embassy of Zemarchus) with the Gokturks for an alliance against Persia; in 570, the Sassanids invaded Yemen, expelling the Byzantines' Aksumite allies and restoring the Himyarite Kingdom as a client state; in 570 and 571, the Sasanians' Arab clients, the Lakhmids, launched raids on Byzantine territory, although on both occasions they were defeated by the Ghassanids, clients of the Byzantines; and in 570, the Byzantines made a secret agreement to support an Armenian rebellion against the Sassanids, which began in 571, accompanied by another revolt in Kingdom of Iberia. The Byzantine emperor Justin II subsequently refused to pay the agreed tribute for peace with Persia, and curtly dismissed a negotiator sent by Khosrow I.

Early in 572, the Armenians under Vardan II Mamikonian defeated the Persian governor of Armenia and captured his headquarters at Dvin; the Persians soon retook the city but shortly afterwards it was captured again by combined Armenian and Byzantine forces and direct hostilities between Byzantines and Persians began. Despite frequent revolts in the 5th century, during the earlier wars of the 6th century the Armenians had largely remained loyal to their Sassanid overlords, unlike their neighbours and fellow Christians in Iberia and Lazica (Colchis). By joining the Iberians, Lazi, and Byzantines in a coalition of the region's Christian peoples, the Armenians dramatically shifted the balance of power in the Caucasus, helping Byzantine forces to carry the war deeper into Persian territory than had previously been possible on this front: throughout the war, Byzantine forces were able to invade as far as Albania (modern Azerbaijan) and even wintered there.

== Fall of Dara ==
In Mesopotamia, however, the war began disastrously for the Byzantines. After a victory at Sargathon in 573, they laid siege to Nisibis and were apparently on the point of capturing this, the chief bulwark of the Persian frontier defences, when the abrupt dismissal of their general Marcian led to a disorderly retreat. Taking advantage of Byzantine confusion, Sassanid forces under Khosrow I (r. 531–579) swiftly counter-attacked and encircled Dara, capturing the city after a four-month siege. At the same time, a smaller Persian army under Adarmahan ravaged Syria, sacking Apamea and a number of other cities. They were only pushed away from Syria proper by a bumbling Byzantine defence near Antioch. To make matters worse, in 572 the Byzantine emperor Justin II (r. 565-578) had ordered the assassination of the Ghassanid king al-Mundhir III; as a result of the unsuccessful attempt on his life, al-Mundhir severed his alliance with the Byzantines, leaving their desert frontier exposed.

The fall of Dara, the main Byzantine stronghold in Mesopotamia, reportedly drove Justin II to insanity, and control of the Byzantine Empire passed to his wife Sophia and Tiberius Constantine. The new regents agreed to pay 45,000 nomismata for a one-year truce, and later in the year extended this to five years, secured by an annual payment of 30,000 nomismata. However, these truces applied only to the Mesopotamian front; in the Caucasus, the war continued.

== Khosrow I's last campaign ==
In 575, the Byzantines managed to settle their differences with the Ghassanids; this renewal of their alliance at once bore dramatic fruit as the Ghassanids sacked the Lakhmid capital at Hira. In the same year, Byzantine forces took advantage of the favourable situation in the Caucasus to campaign in Caucasian Albania and secure hostages from the native tribes. In 576, Khosrow I set out on what was to be his last campaign and one of his most ambitious, staging a long-range strike through the Caucasus into Anatolia, where Persian armies had not been since the time of Shapur I (r. 240–270). His attempts to attack Theodosiopolis and Caesarea were thwarted, but he managed to sack Sebasteia before withdrawing. On the way home, he was intercepted and severely defeated near Melitene by Justinian, the magister militum of the East; pillaging the undefended city of Melitene as they fled, his army suffered further heavy losses as they crossed the Euphrates under Byzantine attack. Khosrow was reportedly so shaken by this fiasco and his own narrow escape that he established a law forbidding any of his successors from leading an army in person, unless to face another monarch also campaigning in person. The Byzantines exploited Persian disarray by raiding deep into Caucasian Albania and Azerbaijan, launching raids across the Caspian Sea against northern Iran, wintering in Persian territory and continuing their attacks into the summer of 577. Khosrow now sued for peace, but a victory in Armenia by his general Tamkhosrow over his recent nemesis Justinian stiffened his resolve and the war continued.

== War returns to Mesopotamia ==
In 578, the truce in Mesopotamia came to an end and the main focus of the war shifted to that front. After Persian raids in Mesopotamia, the new magister militum of the East, Maurice, mounted raids on both sides of the Tigris, captured the fortress of Aphumon and sacked Singara. Khosrow again sought peace in 579, but died before an agreement could be reached and his successor Hormizd IV (r. 579–590) broke off the negotiations. In 580, the Ghassanids scored yet another victory over the Lakhmids, while Byzantine raids again penetrated east of the Tigris. However, around this time the future Khosrow II was put in charge of the situation in Armenia, where he succeeded in convincing most of the rebel leaders to return to Sassanid allegiance, although Iberia remained loyal to the Byzantines. The following year, an ambitious campaign along the Euphrates by Byzantine forces under Maurice and Ghassanid forces under al-Mundhir III failed to make progress, while the Persians under Adarmahan mounted a devastating campaign in Mesopotamia. Maurice and al-Mundhir blamed each other for these difficulties, and their mutual recriminations led to al-Mundhir's arrest in the following year on suspicion of treachery, triggering war between Byzantines and Ghassanids and marking the beginning of the end of the Ghassanid kingdom.

== Stalemate ==
In 582, after a victory at the Battle of Constantina over Adarmahan and Tamkhosrau, in which the latter was killed, Maurice was acclaimed emperor following the death of Tiberius II Constantine (r. 574–582). The advantage gained at Constantina was lost later in the year when his successor as magister militum of the East, John Mystacon, was defeated on the river Nymphios by Kardarigan. During the mid-580s, the war continued inconclusively through raids and counter-raids, punctuated by abortive peace talks; the one significant clash was a Byzantine victory at the Battle of Solachon in 586.

The arrest by the Byzantines of al-Mundhir's successor al-Nu'man in 584 led to the fragmentation of the Ghassanid kingdom, which reverted to a loose tribal coalition and never regained its former power. In 588, a mutiny by unpaid Byzantine troops against their new commander, Priscus, seemed to offer the Sassanids a chance for a breakthrough, but the mutineers themselves repulsed the ensuing Persian offensive; after a subsequent defeat at Tsalkajur, the Byzantines won another victory at Martyropolis. During this year, a group of prisoners taken at the fall of Dara 15 years earlier reportedly escaped from their prison in Khuzestan and fought their way back to Byzantine territory.

== Civil War in Persia ==
In 589, the course of the war was abruptly transformed. In spring, the Byzantine pay dispute was settled, bringing an end to the mutiny, but Martyropolis fell to the Persians through the treachery of an officer named Sittas and Byzantine attempts to retake it under Philippicus were unsuccessful. However, the Philippicus' successor, Comentiolus, won a decisive victory in a pitched battle at Sisauranon, allowing the Byzantines to tighten the siege of Martyropolis. Meanwhile, in the Caucasus, Byzantine and Iberian offensives were repulsed by the Persian general Bahram Chobin, who had recently been transferred from the Central Asian front where he had brought a war with the Göktürks to a successful conclusion. However, after he was defeated by the Byzantines under Romanus in a battle on the river Araxes, Bahram was contemptuously dismissed by Hormizd IV. The general, enraged at this humiliation, raised a revolt which soon gained the support of much of the Sassanid army. Alarmed by his advance, in 590 members of the Persian court overthrew and killed Hormizd, raising his son to the throne as Khosrow II (r. 590–628). Bahram pressed on with his revolt regardless and the defeated Khosrow was soon forced to flee for safety to Byzantine territory, while Bahram took the throne as Bahram VI, marking the first interruption of the Sassanid dynasty's rule since their empire's foundation. With support from Maurice, Khosrow set out to regain the throne, winning the support of the main Persian army at Nisibis and returning Martyropolis to his Byzantine allies. Early in 591, an army sent by Bahram was defeated by Khosrow's supporters near Nisibis, and Ctesiphon was subsequently taken for Khosrow by Mahbodh. Having restored Dara to Byzantine control, Khosrow and the magister militum of the East Narses led a combined army of Byzantine and Persian troops from Mesopotamia into Azerbaijan to confront Bahram, while a second Byzantine army under the magister militum of Armenia John Mystacon staged a pincer movement from the north. At the Battle of Blarathon near Ganzak they decisively defeated Bahram, restoring Khosrow II to power and bringing the war to an end.

== Aftermath ==
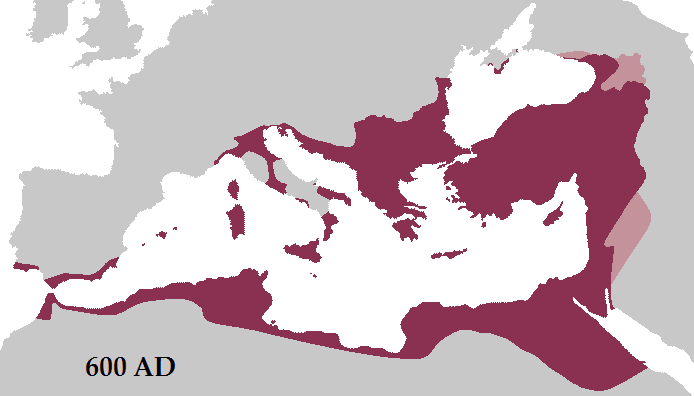
The borders of Byzantium after the war

Having played a vital role in restoring Khosrow II to the throne, the Byzantines were left in a dominant position in their relations with Persia. Khosrow not only returned Dara and Martyropolis in exchange for Maurice's assistance, but also agreed to a new partition of the Caucasus by which the Sassanids handed over to the Byzantines many cities, including Tigranokert, Manzikert, Baguana, Valarsakert, Bagaran, Vardkesavan, Yerevan, Ani, Kars, and Zarisat. The western part of the Kingdom of Iberia, including the cities of Ardahan, Lori, Dmanisi, Lomsia, Mtskheta, and Tontio became Byzantine dependencies. Also, the city of Cytaea was given to Lazica, also a Byzantine dependency. Thus the extent of effective Byzantine control in the Caucasus reached its zenith historically. Also, unlike previous truces and peace treaties, which had usually involved the Byzantines making monetary payments either for peace, for the return of occupied territories, or as a contribution towards the defence of the Caucasus passes, no such payments were included on this occasion, marking a major shift in the balance of power. Emperor Maurice was even in a position to overcome his predecessor's omissions in the Balkans by extensive campaigns. However, this situation was soon dramatically overturned, as the alliance between Maurice and Khosrow helped trigger a new war only eleven years later, with catastrophic results for both empires.
