= Battle of Melitene (576) =

Battle between Byzantines and Sasanians

- Part of the Byzantine–Sasanian War of 572–591
- Byzantine-Sasanian frontier
Date	Spring 576
Location	Melitene, Byzantine Empire (now Malatya, Turkey)
Result	Byzantine victory
Territorial changes	Failure of Khosrow's plans to capture Edessa

Belligerents
Byzantine Empire	Sasanian Empire

Commanders and leaders
Justinian; Cours	Khosrow I

Strength
50,000 (Note: Cours army: 20,000 horsemen; Justinian army: 30,000 horsemen)	70,000 – 90,000 (Note: 30,000-40,000 horseman; 40,000-50,000 infantry); 24 elephants

Casualties and losses
Unknown	35,000 to 45,000 killed (Note: During the massacre near the Euphrates, the Sasanian king lost half of his army.)

The Battle of Melitene, fought in 576, set a Byzantine force commanded by Justinian and Curs against a numerically superior Sasanian army led by Khosrow I. As a result of the battle, the Sasanian king forced to retreat, abandoning his army. Most of the soldiers in his army were killed during the retreat.

== Khosrow's campaign in 576 ==
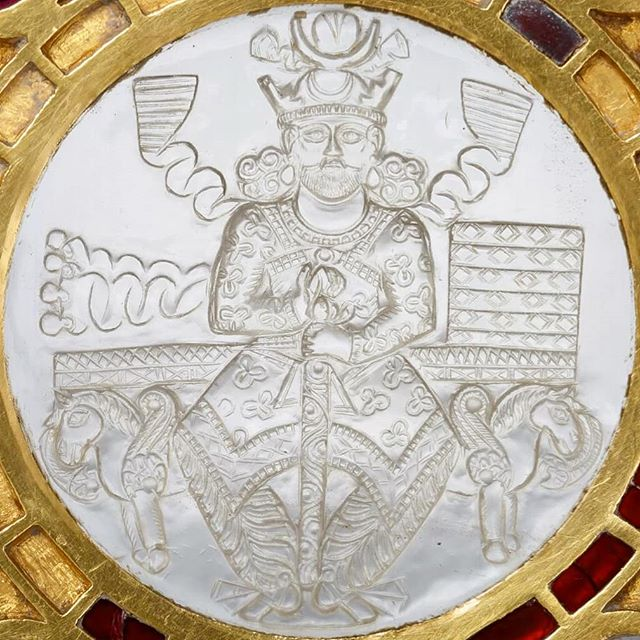
Plate with the image of Khosrow

The Byzantine Emperor Tiberius tried to make a truce with Khosrow to buy time to resolve the problems in the army. He sent Theodore, hoping to initiate a new round of negotiations, but was caught off guard. In the spring of 576, Khosrow attacked in the area where the truce was not in effect. While the armies of Cours and Theodore were busy in Caucasian Albania, Khosrow began his invasion of Byzantium.

Khosrow's plan was to attack quickly while the Byzantine armies were separated. He set off toward Theodosiopolis, but the Byzantine forces, ahead of Khosrow's army, had already evacuated food and civilians. As a result, Khosrow attempted to plunder Caesarea, but the Byzantines were able to outrun the Persians. He then moved on to Sebastea and burned it. The Byzantines' guerrilla warfare tactics were effective, and when Khosrow's efforts were thwarted, he began to move toward Melitene to retreat across the Euphrates.

== Forces of the Parties ==
=== Sasanian army ===
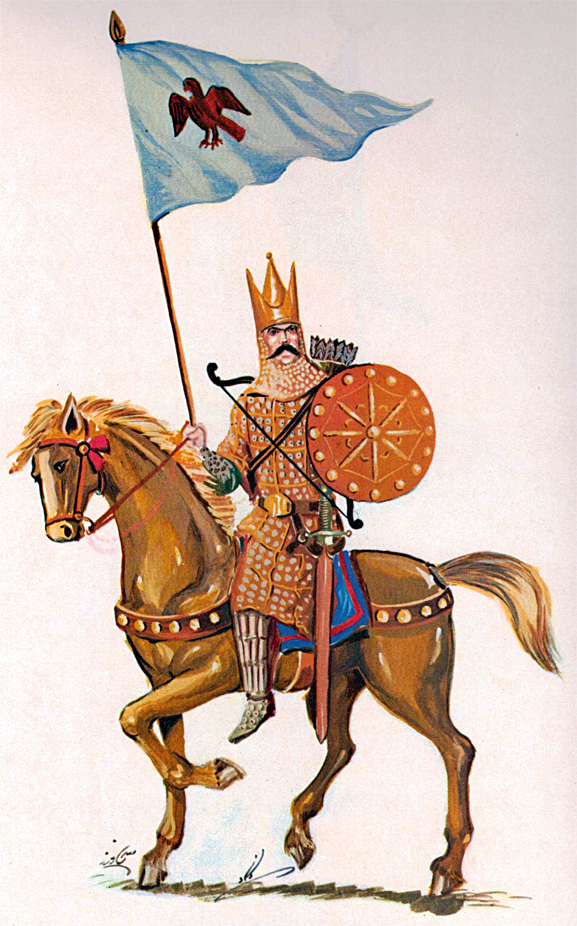
Sasanian cavalrymen

It is impossible to determine the exact number of Khosrow's troops, but an estimate can be made. By analyzing sources that discuss the size of the Sasanian army at the time of the capture of Dara, it is believed that Khosrow commanded a maximum of 40,000 horsemen. In addition, he led around 50,000 infantrymen.

=== Byzantine army ===
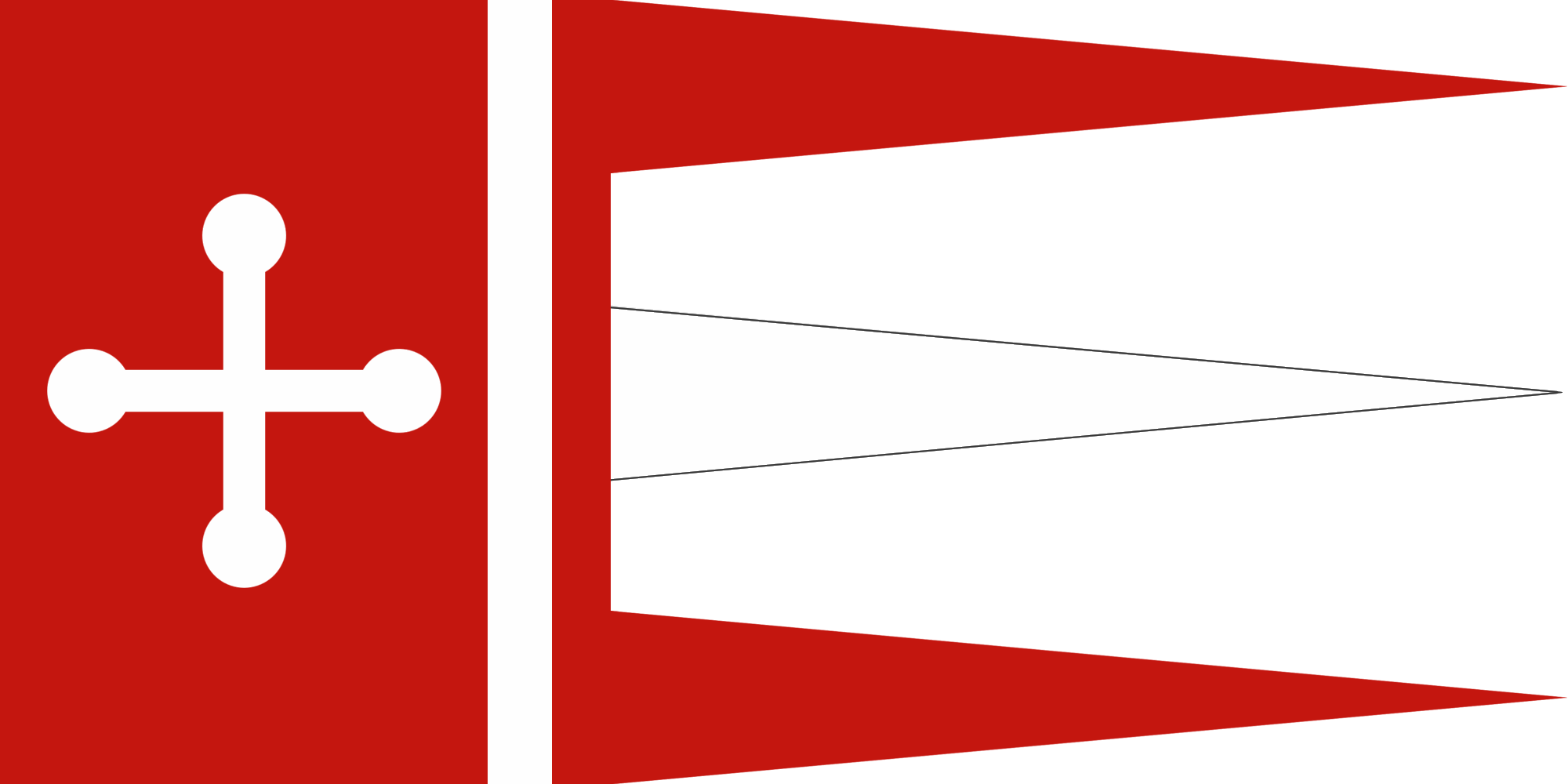
Byzantine cavalry banner

The final version of the Strategikon of Maurice, dating back to the 590s, contains a complete description of the late Roman cavalry system, with diagrams that date to the period after 575, corresponding to the instructions of contemporaries. Based on the accuracy of this perspective, it can be stated that Justinian's army numbered about 30,000 soldiers, and the combined Roman army totaled 50,000 soldiers. This suggests that Cours's army consisted of 20,000 soldiers.

== Battle ==
=== Preparations for battle ===
When Khosrow's attempts were nullified, he began to retreat to Melitene, aiming to cross the Euphrates. However, he was unaware of the unification of the Roman armies. Just before the battle, the commanders of both armies delivered speeches to their men.

=== The alignment of armies ===
The Persians positioned their cavalry in two lines, with the infantry and camp placed behind them. Meanwhile, the Romans employed a ruse. They concealed the second line of their army: the first line was arranged in an open formation, with spears and standards pointed forward, making their line appear as wide as possible, while the second line was formed in a closed formation with lowered spears.

=== The first collision ===
When both armies advanced to meet each other, the Persians unknowingly fell into the trap set by the Romans, who had concealed their second line as a reserve, making their formation deeper. Khosrow sent his second line to the flanks in an attempt to outflank the smaller Roman army, but the Byzantine second line launched a sharp counterattack, causing the Persians to turn around and retreat in chaos. However, the Romans, distracted by the riches of the royal camp, did not pursue the retreating Persians and instead chose to plunder the camp. This allowed Khosrow to reorganize his infantry into a square and reform his retreating cavalry. While the Roman forces were scattered, Khosrow attacked Justinian's northern camp, plundered it, and put it to flight. Afterward, the Sassanid king proceeded to Melitene and plundered it.

=== Battle of Melitene ===
Using the conflict in the command of the Byzantine army, Khosrow burned Melitene and was about to cross the Euphrates with his army, but the newly united Byzantine leadership decided to resort to another trick. They challenged the Sassanian king directly:

This, what you have done, namely attacking and burning a city, is not in accordance with the stature of a king, namely to create ruins and run away. Even for us ourselves, servants of the emperor, it would be very disgraceful if we were to do what you have done. How much more (is it disgraceful) for you, because you not only think of yourself as a king, but even as the king of kings. For it is not proper for a king to do such deeds, to come with a band of robbers, to plunder, flee, set fire and burn. But it befits a king authoritatively, confidently and regally to take up position openly in battle, and whenever he wins, let him subsequently triumph as a king, and let him not enter as a thief, cause damage, steal and run away. But prepare yourself and we will do battle against one another in the open in order that both victory and defeat will clearly be known to the others

— Justinian and Curs

Lined up near Melitene, both armies simply watched each other, despite the provocations from the Roman side. At night, when both sides withdrew to their camps, the Persians attempted to cross the Euphrates. However, the Romans had anticipated this move and, as the Sasanians began to retreat, they launched an attack, triggering a massacre in which many Persians were killed. The Sasanian king managed to escape with only half of his army.

== Aftermath ==
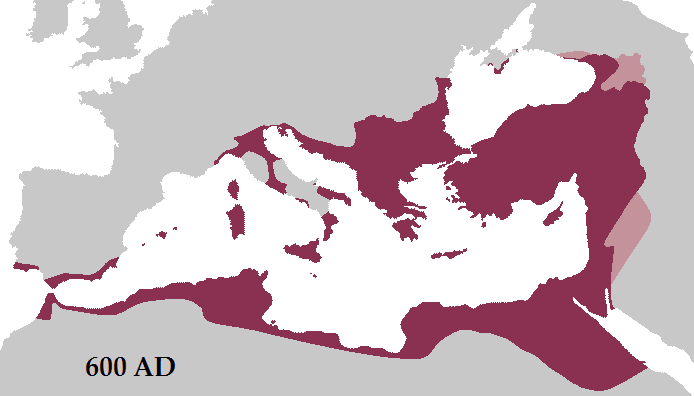
The borders of Byzantium after the war

After this battle, Khosrow issued a decree forbidding the Sassanian kings from personally commanding an army, unless it was a battle against another king. The Romans took advantage of their victory and invaded Persia, but one of the Roman armies was defeated, and Justinian died in this disaster.

== See also ==
- Byzantine–Sasanian War of 572–591
- Battle of the Blarathon
