= Justinian (magister militum per Orientem) =

6th-century Byzantine military general

- Born: after 525; Constantinople (modern-day Istanbul, Turkey)
- Died: 582; Constantinople
- Relatives: Germanus (father); Justin (brother); Justin II (cousin); John (brother-in-law)
- Military career
- Allegiance: Byzantine Empire
- Rank: magister militum
- Conflicts: Byzantine–Sasanian War of 572–591; Battle of Melitene (576); Tamkhusrau's Armenian Campaign (577)

Justinian (Latin: Iustinianus, Greek: Ἰουστινιανός, after 525–582) was a Byzantine aristocrat and general, and a member of the ruling Justinian dynasty. As a soldier, he had a distinguished career in the Balkans and in the East against Sassanid Persia. In his later years, he plotted unsuccessfully against regent and later emperor Tiberius II (r. 574–582).

== Biography ==
=== Origins and early career ===
Justinian was born in Constantinople sometime shortly after 525, the second son of Germanus, a cousin to the Emperor Justinian I (r. 527–565). He had an elder brother, Justin, and a sister, Justina, who married the general John.

Justinian was first appointed to military command in 550, when he, together with his brother Justin, were to accompany their father in his expedition against Ostrogoth Italy. Germanus, however, died suddenly in autumn 550, before the army had left the Balkans, where it was assembling. After this, Justinian and John (Germanus's son-in-law) were ordered to lead the army towards Salona (modern Split, Croatia), in preparation for a crossing over to Italy or an overland march to Venetia. John remained in charge of the army until the eunuch Narses, who was appointed as the expedition's new commander-in-chief in early 551, arrived at Salona to take up command. In early 552, Justinian was placed at the head of an expedition against the Slavs who were raiding Illyricum, and shortly after, was sent to assist the Lombards against the Gepids. His brother Justin was also a member of this army. The two brothers, however, were detained by the need to suppress a revolt in the city of Ulpiana, and never arrived to aid the Lombards.

=== Career in the East ===
Map of the Byzantine-Persian frontier.

Nothing is known of Justinian during the next 20 years. By 572, however, he had risen to the rank of patricius and was placed as commander-in-chief of the forces in the northeastern sector of the Empire's frontier with Sassanid Persia (magister militum per Armeniam). From this post, he supported the outbreak of the Iberian and Armenian rebellion against the Sassanids, which led to the outbreak of a twenty-year-long conflict between Byzantium and Persia.

In 572, he supported the Armenian forces under Vardan III Mamikonian in their defence of Dvin, and, when the fortress eventually fell, in its recapture later in the year. Soon, however, he was recalled to Constantinople because of friction with the Armenians. In late 574 or early 575, he was appointed as magister militum per Orientem and overall commander of the Byzantine forces in the East. In this role, he set about training the numerous fresh troops raised by the Empire, and effected a reconciliation with the Ghassanid ruler al-Mundhir, restoring thus the traditional Byzantine alliance with his people. A three-year truce was soon after concluded for the Mesopotamian front, but it did not apply to Armenia.

In summer 575 or 576, Justinian failed to block the advance of the Persian army, headed by Shah Khosrau I (r. 531–579) himself, through Persarmenia. When the shah entered into Byzantine Cappadocia and advanced towards Caesarea, Justinian gathered a superior army and blocked the mountain passes leading to it. Khosrau withdrew, sacking Sebasteia in the process. Justinian pursued Khosrau, and twice he trapped him in a pincer movement: the first time, the Persian shah and his army only escaped after abandoning their camp and their belongings to the Byzantines, while the second, the Romans were defeated at a night attack against their encampments near Melitene due to dissension amongst the army's commanders. Then the Persians stormed Melitene and burned it down. As the Persian army was preparing to cross the Euphrates, however, Justinian's forces caught up with them. The next day, the two armies drew up in battle formation near Melitene, but did not clash. Come nightfall, the Persians tried to cross the river in secret, but were detected and attacked by the Byzantines during the crossing. The Persians suffered heavy casualties, while the Byzantines captured great booty, including 24 war elephants which were sent to Constantinople. In the following winter, Justinian advanced deep into Persian territory, through Media Atropatene, and wintered with his army on the southern shores of the Caspian Sea. Nevertheless, he was unable to regain control over Persarmenia.

In 576/577, the Persian general Tamkhusro invaded Armenia, where he defeated the Byzantines under Justinian. Later, Tamkhusro and Adarmahan launched a major raid into the Byzantine province of Osroene. They threatened the town of Constantina, but withdrew when they received word of the approach of the Byzantine army under Justinian. Following these reversals, later in the same year, the Byzantine regent, Caesar Tiberius, appointed Maurice as Justinian's successor.

=== Last years and court intrigues ===
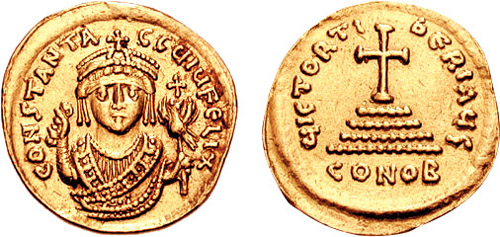
Gold solidus of Emperor Tiberius II (r. 574–582). Despite his repeated plotting to overthrow him, the emperor pardoned Justinian.

Returning to the capital, according to reports preserved exclusively in Western sources, Justinian was involved in a plot with the Empress Sophia over the succession of her husband, Justin II (r. 565–578), whose health was rapidly deteriorating. They intended to assassinate Justin's heir, the Caesar Tiberius (ruled as Tiberius II in 578–582), and have Justinian ascend the throne. Tiberius, however, discovered the plot, whereupon Justinian pleaded for forgiveness and offered 1,500 pounds of gold as a sign of contrition. Soon, however, between 579 and 581, Sophia and Justinian were plotting again. This conspiracy too was uncovered, but Justinian was again pardoned. Justinian had a daughter and a son, who is likely identifiable with Germanus, who was married to Tiberius's daughter Charito and raised to the rank of Caesar. Justinian died at Constantinople in 582.

== Sources ==
- Bury, John Bagnell (1958) [1923]. History of the Later Roman Empire: From the Death of Theodosius I to the Death of Justinian, Volume 2. Mineola, New York: Dover Publications. OCLC 41478187.
- Greatrex, Geoffrey; Lieu, Samuel N. C. (2002). The Roman Eastern Frontier and the Persian Wars (Part II, 363–630 AD). New York and London: Routledge (Taylor & Francis). ISBN 0-415-14687-9.
- Kaegi, Walter Emil (1991). "Justinian". In Kazhdan, Alexander (ed.). The Oxford Dictionary of Byzantium. Oxford and New York: Oxford University Press. p. 1083. ISBN 0-19-504652-8.
- Martindale, John R., ed. (1980). The Prosopography of the Later Roman Empire: Volume II, AD 395–527. Cambridge: Cambridge University Press. ISBN 0-521-20159-4.
- Martindale, John R., ed. (1992). The Prosopography of the Later Roman Empire: Volume III, AD 527–641. Cambridge: Cambridge University Press. ISBN 0-521-20160-8.
- Venetis, Evangelos (31 October 2003). Ιουστινιανός. Encyclopaedia of the Hellenic World, Asia Minor (in Greek). Athens: Foundation of the Hellenic World.
