= John Mystacon =

Byzantine military officer

John, surnamed Mystacon ("the mustachioed"; Greek: Ἰωάννης ὁ Μυστάκων; fl. 580–590), was a prominent Eastern Roman general in the wars with Sassanid Persia during the reigns of Byzantine emperors Tiberius II (r. 578–582) and Maurice (r. 582–602).

== Biography ==
A native Thracian, John first appears in history as a general in Roman Armenia in 579, along with Cours. If not already holding the post of magister militum per Armeniam at that time, he had been elevated to it by 582, when he was named magister militum per Orientem by the newly crowned Maurice. Soon after this, possibly in autumn 582, he fought a major pitched battle with the Sassanid Persians under Kardarigan near the junction of the rivers Nymphius (modern Batman) and Tigris. In this battle, John commanded the center, while his old colleague Cours commanded the right wing and general Ariulf the left wing. Initially, the battle went well, the center and left pushing the Persians back, but Cours did not follow up, allegedly due to his jealousy of John, causing the East Roman army to retreat in defeat. After another defeat during an unsuccessful siege of the fort Acbas, he was replaced (in late 583) by Philippicus.

In about 585 he married Placidia, daughter of Anastasius and Juliana (a descendant of Anicius Olybrius, Western Roman Emperor). It has been suggested that John Mystacon was the son of Artabanes, a descendant of the Arsacids whose father and brother were called John. Artabanes had been appointed Magister Militum of Thrace in 550, which aligns with John Mystacon being born there. In this reconstruction, John and Placidia may have had two sons: Manuel and Valentinus Arsakouni, who were also of Arsacid descent.

In 587, he was briefly entrusted with command in Thrace against the Avars after their defeat and capture of the local commander Castus. John successfully relieved the Avar siege of Adrianople after defeating them in battle, but refused to pursue them out of caution. By 589, he was back in command in Armenia as magister militum, a post he held until a few years after the 591 peace with Persia, when relieved by Heraclius the Elder. At about the same time, he was raised to the rank of patricius. In 589, he laid siege to the Armenian capital Dvin, but raised it when he heard of the rebellion of general Bahram Chobin against the Persian shah, Hormizd IV (r. 579–590). Taking advantage of the Persian infighting, he raided into Persian-held Azerbaijan, carrying off much booty and many captives. In 591, he took part in the joint Roman–Persian campaign under Narses to restore Khosrau II (r. 590–628), the rightful Persian ruler, to his throne. At the head of his Armenian troops, he fought in the decisive Battle of Blarathon, which signalled the final defeat of the usurper Bahram.

== Sources ==
- Greatrex, Geoffrey; Lieu, Samuel N. C. (2002). The Roman Eastern Frontier and the Persian Wars (Part II, 363–630 AD). London, United Kingdom: Routledge. ISBN 0-415-14687-9.
- Martindale, John R., ed. (1992). The Prosopography of the Later Roman Empire: Volume III, AD 527–641. Cambridge: Cambridge University Press. ISBN 0-521-20160-8.
