= Tamkhosrow =

6th-century Sassanid general

Tamkhosrau

Marzban of Persian Armenia
- In office 577–579
- Monarchs: Khosrau I, Hormizd IV
- Preceded by: Vardan III Mamikonian
- Succeeded by: Varaz Vzur

Personal details
- Born: Unknown
- Died: June 582 Constantina

Tamkhosrau or Tamkhusro ("strong Khosrau", in Greek sources rendered as Ταμχοσρώ or Ταμχοσρόης, Tamchosroes), was a Sassanid Persian general active in the Roman–Persian Wars of the late 6th century. As his honorific name indicates, he was a highly regarded man among the Persians, and one of the chief generals of the shah Khosrau I (r. 531–579).

== Biography ==
Tamkhosrau first appears in early 575. A one-year truce had been negotiated in 574, interrupting the ongoing war (since 572) between Persia and the East Roman (Byzantine) Empire, while negotiations were taking place to conclude an even longer truce. While the Persians insisted on a five-year truce, the Roman emissaries refused to accept it and insisted on a three-year duration. In order to apply pressure on the Byzantines, the Persian general Mahbod ordered Tamkhosrau to launch an attack. Tamkhosrau led a major raid that plundered the territory around Dara in northern Mesopotamia. A three-year truce was concluded soon after, in exchange for an annual payment of 30,000 gold solidi from the Byzantines.

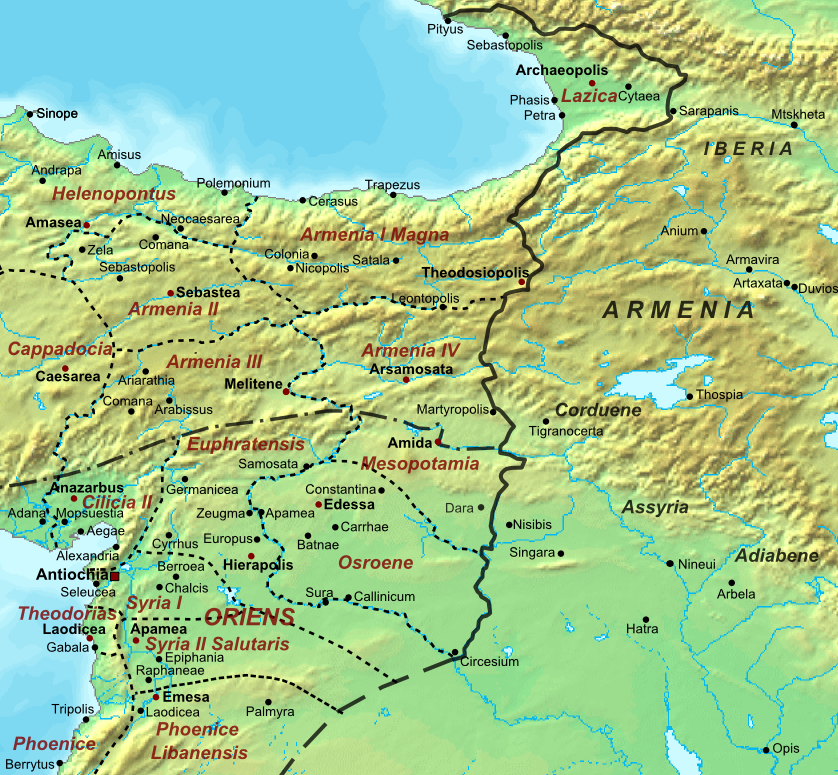
Map of the Byzantine–Persian frontier.

As a result of the truce, fighting was refocused to Persian Armenia; there, the Byzantines had considerable success, driving off a large Persian invasion led by Khosrau himself, and securing much of the country. Negotiations for peace resumed, and seemed about to be concluded on terms slightly favoring the Byzantines in 577, when Tamkhosrau led a series of expeditions into Armenia and defeated the East Roman general Justinian. Thereafter, the Persians abandoned the negotiations. Tamkhosrau remained in Armenia as the senior Persian commander in 578. As his forces were numerically inferior to those of the Roman magister militum Armeniae Maurice, after feinting in the direction of Theodosiopolis, he led a surprise raid south and plundered the regions around Martyropolis and Amida. His decision, however, was criticized by the Persians as the result of inexperience, and he was recalled and replaced in his Armenian command by Varaz Vzur.

By 581, however, he had risen to the post of marzban, and commanded the Persian army in northern Mesopotamia. After another round of peace talks broke down, Tamkhosrau, along with Adarmahan, invaded Roman territory and headed for the town of Constantina. Maurice, who had been expecting and preparing for such an attack, met the Persians in battle outside the city in June 582. The Persian army suffered a heavy defeat, and Tamkhosrau was killed.

== Sources ==
- Greatrex, Geoffrey; Lieu, Samuel N. C. (2002). The Roman Eastern Frontier and the Persian Wars (Part II, 363–630 AD). New York, New York and London, United Kingdom: Routledge (Taylor & Francis). ISBN 0-415-14687-9.
- Martindale, John R., ed. (1992). The Prosopography of the Later Roman Empire: Volume III, AD 527–641. Cambridge: Cambridge University Press. ISBN 0-521-20160-8.

| Preceded by Vardan III Mamikonian | Marzban of Persian Armenia; 577–579 | Succeeded by Varaz Vzur |
