= Varaz Vzur =

Marzban of Persian Armenia
- In office 579–580
- Monarch: Hormizd IV
- Preceded by: Tamkhosrau
- Succeeded by: Pahlav

Personal details
- Born: Unknown
- Died: Unknown Marzpanate Armenia

Varaz Vzur was an Armenian nobleman who served as the marzban of Persian Armenia from 579 to 580. In 579, he succeeded Tamkhosrau as the marzban of Armenia. Some time later, a group of Armenians revolted against Sasanian rule. Varaz Vzur fought the rebels at Uthmus. Although he was first repulsed by the Armenian rebels, he eventually managed to emerge victorious. One year later, he was succeeded by Pahlav.

== Sources ==
- Greatrex, Geoffrey; Lieu, Samuel N. C. (2002). The Roman Eastern Frontier and the Persian Wars (Part II, 363–630 AD). New York, New York and London, United Kingdom: Routledge (Taylor & Francis). ISBN 0-415-14687-9.
- Martindale, John Robert; Jones, Arnold Hugh Martin; Morris, J., eds. (1992). The Prosopography of the Later Roman Empire, Volume III: A.D. 527–641. Cambridge, United Kingdom: Cambridge University Press. ISBN 978-0-521-20160-5.
- (in French) Les dynasties de la Caucasie chrétienne de l’Antiquité jusqu’au XIXe siècle; Tables généalogiques et chronologiques, Rome, 1990.

Preceded by Tamkhosrau	Marzban of Persian Armenia; 579–580	Succeeded by Pahlav
