= Cours (Byzantine general) =

Cours or Curs (Greek: Κούρς), also known as Coursos, Cursos (Greek: Κοῦρσος), Qwrys, Crous or Crus (Greek: Κρους), was an East Roman (Byzantine) general of the 6th century.

== Biography ==
Cours is recorded as being a "Scythian", which in effect implies most probably a Hunnic (or perhaps Gothic) origin. Nothing is known of his early life, except that he served in Italy in the 550s under Narses.

Map of the Roman-Persian frontier, where Cours spent his military career.

He first appears in 574, after the outbreak of a new war with Sassanid Persia in 572, when he was placed, along with general Theodorus, in command of the Byzantine army of Armenia. Probably late in the same year, or in 575, they invaded Caucasian Albania, taking hostages from the Albani, Sabiri, and other tribes to ensure their loyalty. They resumed operations in Albania in the next year, but their absence from Armenia was exploited by the Persian shah Khosrow I (r. 531–579), who passed through Armenia unmolested and invaded Byzantine territory, reaching as far as Sebastea; there, however, he was confronted by the converging armies of Curs and the magister militum per Orientem, Justinian. While Khosrau, confronted by a larger army than he expected, refused to offer battle, Curs on his own initiative attacked, drove part of the Persian army back, and captured most of the Persian baggage train.

In 578, Cours served with Maurice, then the magister militum per Orientem and future emperor, on his first, successful campaign against the Persians. In the autumn of that year, Maurice sent him across the river Tigris to plunder Persian territory. In the next year, Cours and John Mystacon together led Byzantine forces in Armenia, winning a victory over the Persians that resulted in the capture of the Persian commander himself and his son, as well as much booty. In late 582, however, serving as John's hypostrategos (deputy commander), through his inaction (allegedly due to jealousy towards John), the Byzantines were defeated in battle. He disappears thereafter from the sources, and may have been dismissed in the same year.

== Sources ==
- Greatrex, Geoffrey; Lieu, Samuel N. C. (2002). The Roman Eastern Frontier and the Persian Wars (Part II, 363–630 AD). London, United Kingdom: Routledge. ISBN 0-415-14687-9.
- Martindale, John R., ed. (1992). The Prosopography of the Later Roman Empire: Volume III, AD 527–641. Cambridge: Cambridge University Press. ISBN 0-521-20160-8.
