= Adarmahan =

6th-century Sasanian general

Adarmahān (in Greek sources given as Ἀδααρμάνης, Adaarmanes; fl. late 6th century) was a Persian general active in the western frontier of the Sassanid Empire against the East Roman (Byzantine) forces, during the Byzantine–Sassanid War of 572–591.

Alberto Bernard (2023) identifies the general with Wahrām ī Nām-xwāst-Husraw Ādurmāhān, Spahbed of Nēmrōz, known from stamped clay sealings, and the "vizier Bahrām-e Āḏarmāhān" in Muslim sources.

== Biography ==
Map of the Byzantine–Persian frontier.

Adarmahān is recorded as a marzbān (general of a frontier province, "margrave"), probably of Nisibis, by the Syriac historian John of Ephesus. He was posted at Nisibis in 573, when the Persian king, Khosrau I (r. 531–579), sent him at the head of an army to invade the Roman province of Syria. He devastated the province, sacked the city of Apamea, capturing several thousand prisoners, and defeated a small Roman force under general Magnus.

In 577, he raided the Roman province of Osrhoene, but withdrew at the approach of a strong Roman army under general Justinian. In 580, the East Roman general Maurice advanced with an army along the river Euphrates toward the Sassanid capital, Ctesiphon. In response, Adarmahan was ordered to begin operations in northern Mesopotamia (581), threatening the Roman army's supply line and forcing Maurice to stop and withdraw his army north. Adarmahan pillaged Osrhoene, and was successful in capturing its capital, Edessa. Then he marched his army toward Callinicum on the Euphrates. There, however, he was met by Maurice and his army, and suffered a minor defeat which caused him to retreat. In June of the same or the next year, Adarmahan suffered a heavy defeat by Maurice at the Battle of Constantina, barely escaping the field, while his co-commander Tamkhosrau was killed. Thereafter, Adarmahan disappears from history.

== Sources ==
- Greatrex, Geoffrey; Lieu, Samuel N. C. (2002). The Roman Eastern Frontier and the Persian Wars (Part II, 363–630 AD). New York, New York and London, United Kingdom: Routledge (Taylor & Francis). ISBN 0-415-14687-9.
- Martindale, John R., ed. (1992). The Prosopography of the Later Roman Empire: Volume III, AD 527–641. Cambridge: Cambridge University Press. ISBN 0-521-20160-8.
- Shahîd, Irfan (1995). Byzantium and the Arabs in the Sixth Century. Washington, District of Columbia: Dumbarton Oaks. ISBN 978-0-88402-214-5.
