= Constantia (Osrhoene) =

Ancient city of Osroene

Coordinates: 37°13′44″N 39°45′21″E

Constantia or Konstantia (Ancient Greek: Κωνσταντία) was a town of some importance in the province Osrhoene in Mesopotamia, on the road between Nisibis and Carrhae, at no great distance from Edessa. It was, after his departure from Nisibis, the residence of the dux Mesopotamiae until the foundation of Dara. There is considerable variation in different authors in the way in which the name of this town is written and the names under which it is known, including: Constantia or Konstantia (Κωνσταντία), Constantina or Konstantina (Κωνσταντίνα), Antoninopolis, Nicephorium or Nikephorion (Νικηφόριον), Maximianopolis (Μαξιμιανούπολις), Constantinopolis in Osrhoene, Tella and Antiochia Arabis, Antiochia in Mesopotamia (Ἀντιόχεια τῆς Μεσοποταμίας – Antiocheia tes Mesopotamias) and Antiochia in Arabia (Ἀντιόχεια ἡ Ἀραβική – Antiocheia e Arabike).

== History ==
According to Pliny, it was founded by Seleucus I Nicator after the death of Alexander the Great. According to the Byzantine historian John Malalas, the city was built by the Roman Emperor Constantine I on the site of former Maximianopolis, which had been destroyed by a Persian attack and an earthquake. It was near the city, where the significant Battle of Constantina was fought.

=== Bishopric ===
Under the names Constantina and Tella, it was also a bishopric, suffragan of Edessa; some names of early bishops have been preserved, including Sophronius who attended the Council of Antioch in 445. No longer a residential bishop, it remains a titular see of the Roman Catholic Church under the name Constantina. The city was captured by the Arabs in 639.

== Notable people ==
• Jacob Baradaeus (c. 500–578), Bishop of Edessa

== Location ==
Its site is near the modern Viranşehir, Turkey.

== Sources ==
- Syvänne, Ilkka (2022). The Military History of Late Rome AD 565-602. Pen and Sword. ISBN 978-1526793959.

Attribution:
