= Zoroastrianism in Sichuan =

Historical religion in Sichuan

Zoroastrianism in Sichuan refers to the historical presence of Zoroastrianism in modern-day Sichuan province, that forms part of southwestern China. The Japanese professor Kiichirō Kanda was the first scholar to notice the Zoroastrian presence in medieval Sichuan, or Yizhou as it was officially known from late antiquity to the Early Middle Ages, but commonly referred to as Shu, after the realm's first polity, the ancient kingdom of Shu. He believed that Zoroastrianism was popular in the region during the Tang dynasty (618–907), after learning of the festival songs of the magi (Note: Festival songs of the magi, or muhu festival songs (traditional Chinese: 穆護歌; simplified Chinese: 穆护歌; pinyin: Mùhù gē; Sichuanese romanization: Mu^{5} Fu^{4} Ko^{1}) refer to the music used in saixian (賽祆). Sai designated a thanksgiving ritual and xian designated Mazdeanism. The expression seems to correspond to the Zoroastrian ceremony Āfrīnagān.) present in the yuefu folk music of Kuizhou, and reading an entry titled "The Princess [of Shu]" from the 16th-century encyclopedia Extended Investigations of the Mountain Hall, in 1928. Fifty years later, the Hong Kong scholar Jao Tsung-I confirmed the existence of Zoroastrian temples in Sichuan during the Song dynasty (960–1279) in his article "Investigation of the Festival Songs of the Magi". (Note: "Investigation of the Festival Songs of the Magi" (Chinese: 穆護歌考; Jyutping: Muk^{6} Wu^{6} Go^{1} Haau^{2}; pinyin: Mù hù gē kǎo)) Contemporary scholars such as Li Guotao and Hou Hui have researched the links between certain Zoroastrian deities and Erlang Shen, otherwise known as the Lord of Sichuan; as well as Yao Chongxin's more comprehensive research on the topic.

== Background: Iranians in the realm of Shu ==
=== Shu and the ancient trade routes ===
The export of goods from Shu was confirmed by Zhang Qian (175 BC – 114 BC), an imperial envoy to Central Asia. According to the "Description of Dayuan" in the Historical Records by Sima Qian (c. 145 BC – c. 86 BC), the envoy visited Daxia (i.e., Bactria) and was surprised to find in the Greco-Bactrian Kingdom two products from the Shu region—Shu brocade and Qiong bamboo stick made of Qiongzhuea tumidissinoda. Zhang Qian concluded that there must be a southern trade route connecting Shu to India, since the northern routes were under control of the Qiang and the Xiongnu peoples.

Li Ruizhe has proposed that private trades between Bactria and Shu already existed before Zhang Qian's journey to Central Asia, although there is no direct evidence of the entry of Bactrian merchants into Shu. It cannot be ruled out that many goods were obtained by the Bactrians from India through transit trade. However, it is possible that these Bactrians paved the way for the future Sogdian merchants.

=== Sogdians ===
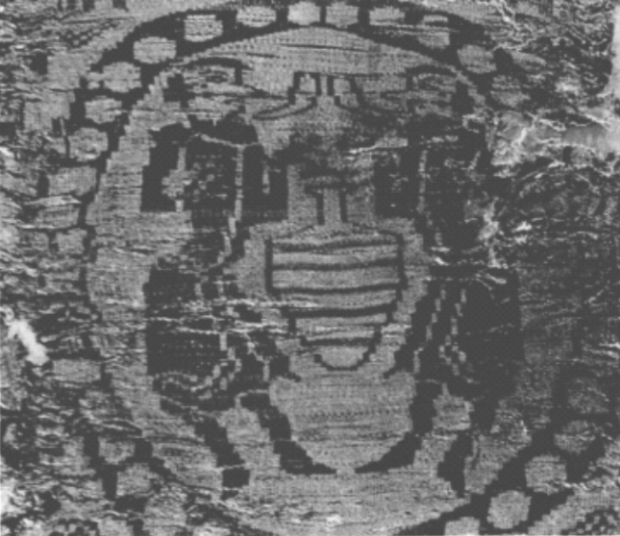
Drinking scene involving two Byzantines or Central Asians within the Sogdian pearl roundel. Sichuan brocade, 7th–early 10th century.

Sogdian immigrants reached Yizhou as early as the Shu Han period (221–263), and flourished during the Liang dynasty (502–557). This may have led to the establishment of Sogdian colonies in the vicinity of Chengdu in the 6th century. Apart from Sogdia, the original homelands of the Yizhou Sogdians may also include several kingdoms in the Western Regions, namely, Chalmadana, Charklik, Khotan, Kroraïna, Qocho, and the nearby de facto independent state of Guiyi Dunhuang. Their journey probably began in the Western Regions, passed through Tuyuhun, Songzhou, (Note: Songzhou, in modern-day Sungqu, northwestern Sichuan.) and went down further south to reach Chengdu. There were also Zhongyuan-born Sogdians who moved westward into Yizhou, but the number was insignificant.

He Chou and his uncle He Tuo were perhaps the most well-known Yizhou Sogdians during the 6th to 7th centuries. The He family settled in Pi County and became extremely wealthy through business, which earned them the appellation of "the great merchant family of the western regions". He Chou was the head of the Shu ateliers producing silks in the "western style". He had amassed a sizeable fortune from his expertise in weaving silk with gold thread, a technique said to have come from the Byzantine Empire. He was later promoted to head of the imperial wardrobe in the Sui dynasty (581–618).

Sogdian colonies in Chengdu are confirmed in the time of the Tang dynasty (618–907). Sogdian temples are also attested during this period. According to Étienne de la Vaissière, "Baghshūr" (lit. 'pond of salt water') may be the Sogdian name for the region of Chengdu. This toponym is attested near Merv, but not far from Chengdu are found the large salt water wells of the Yangtze basin.

In the epitaph of An Shi (Note: An Shi (traditional Chinese: 安師; simplified Chinese: 安师; pinyin: Ān Shī; Sichuanese romanization: Ngan^{1} Sï^{1})) unearthed in Luoyang, it is recorded that the Sogdian An Shi served as the commander of the mansion guard of Li Yin (c. 621–667), the fourth Prince of Shu of the Tang dynasty, apparently inheriting the Sogdian tradition of holding military positions.

Hua Jingding (fl. 8th century), an officer with the rank of General of the Standard from western Yizhou, was a famed military figure of his time. His reputation is evident in Du Fu's poem "A Song for Lord Hua Playfully Written": (Note: Original title in traditional Chinese: 戲作花卿歌; simplified Chinese: 戏作花卿歌; pinyin: Xì zuò Huā qīng gē; Sichuanese romanization: Shi^{4} Tso^{5} Hua^{1} Ch'in^{1} Ko^{1}. English translation published in The Poetry of Du Fu, Volume 3.) "Of the fierce generals of Chengdu there is our Lord Hua, little children learning to speak all know his name. He acts like the fleet eagle, a fire fanned by the wind, only where he sees many foes does his body become light." In accordance with the Sogdian practice of adopting the name of their hometown as their Chinese surname, Hua (Middle Chinese pronunciation: Hwaɨ) indicates the person's ancestral homeland being Hwa-zim, that is, Khwarazm, or Chorasmia in its Greek form.

Buddhism and Zoroastrianism were the predominant religions among the Yizhou Sogdians. Shi Daoxian (Note: Shi Daoxian (traditional Chinese: 釋道仙; simplified Chinese: 释道仙; pinyin: Shì Dàoxiān; Sichuanese romanization: Shï^{5} Tao^{4} Sien^{1})) and Shi Mingda, (Note: Shi Mingda (traditional Chinese: 釋明達; simplified Chinese: 释明达; pinyin: Shì Míngdá; Sichuanese romanization: Shï^{5} Min^{2} Ta^{5})) originally from Kangju, became well-known śramaṇas after settling in Yizhou in the 6th century. Shi Shenhui, (Note: Shi Shenhui (traditional Chinese: 釋神會; simplified Chinese: 释神会; pinyin: Shì Shénhuì; Sichuanese romanization: Shï^{5} Shen^{2} Hue^{4})) originally from Chach, became one of the representatives of the Baotang School of Chan Buddhism in Chengdu during the Tang dynasty.

Although no named Zoroastrian individuals have been found in existing sources, the spread of Zoroastrianism in Shu can be attested by the popularity of the festival songs of the magi, and the existence of the Zoroastrian temple in Guankou in the time of the kingdoms of Former Shu (907–925) and Later Shu (934–965). Moreover, Guankou was a region bordering Pi County where the above-mentioned He family settled. Nevertheless, Zoroastrianism may have been introduced to the realm much earlier than the 900s. According to the epitaph of the Zoroastrian sārtpāw, An Jia (518–579), his father An Tujian (Note: An Tujian (Chinese: 安突建; pinyin: Ān Tūjiàn; Sichuanese romanization: Ngan^{1} T'u^{1} Chien^{4})) served as a governor of Mei Prefecture in western Yizhou.

=== Persians ===
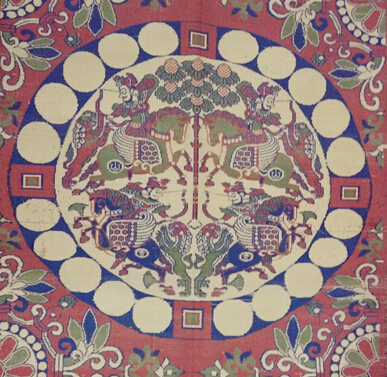
Sasanian horsemen hunting scene within the Sogdian pearl roundel. Motif of a 7th–10th-century Sichuan brocade fabric.

It was not uncommon to see Persian immigrants in Yizhou during the Northern and Southern dynasties (420–589). Their influence reached its peak during the period of Tang (618–907), Former (907–925) and Later Shu (934–965). Among those in the recorded history whose names are known today including the two Parthians, An Feihan (Note: An Feihan (Chinese: 安朏汗; pinyin: Ān Fěihàn; Sichuanese romanization: Ngan^{1} Fe^{3} Han^{4})) and his son An Fuguo, (Note: An Fuguo (traditional Chinese: 安附國; simplified Chinese: 安附国; pinyin: Ān Fùguó; Sichuanese romanization: Ngan^{1} Fu^{4} Kue^{5})) both served as the governor of Weizhou (Note: Weizhou, in modern-day Li County, northwestern Sichuan.) in the 7th century; Shi Chuwen (Note: Shi Chuwen (traditional Chinese: 石處溫; simplified Chinese: 石处温; pinyin: Shí Chùwēn; Sichuanese romanization: Shï^{5} Ch'u^{3} Uen^{1})) from Wanzhou, held the official post of war minister of Lizhou during the Former Shu period, and governor of Jiangzhou during the Later Shu period; and Mu Zhaosi, (Note: Mu Zhaosi (Chinese: 穆昭嗣; pinyin: Mù Zhāosì; Sichuanese romanization: Mu^{5} Chao^{1} Ts'ï^{2})) a renowned physician from the region of the former Badong Commandery in eastern Yizhou, was active from Former Shu to early Song period.

A certain Su Yin (Note: Su Yin (traditional Chinese: 蘇陰; simplified Chinese: 苏阴; pinyin: Sū Yīn; Sichuanese romanization: Su^{1} In^{1})) from Jia Prefecture composed some festival songs of the magi in the style of the music for Bayu dance. Jao Tsung-I speculated that the name Su Yin (Middle Chinese pronunciation: Su Jəm) was a transliteration of Sūrēn in Pahlavi, which indicates a member of the House of Suren. Su Yin's familiarity with the magi songs is consistent with the Suren family's Zoroastrian background.

The most well-known Persians were perhaps the Li siblings of Zizhou (Note: Zizhou, in modern-day Santai County, northwestern Sichuan.) flourished during the time of the kingdom of Former Shu. The two brothers, Li Xun and Li Xuan, were accomplished physicians and pharmacologists. The former was the author of Overseas Pharmacopoeia (Note: Overseas Pharmacopoeia (traditional Chinese: 海藥本草; simplified Chinese: 海药本草; pinyin: Hǎiyào Běncǎo; Sichuanese romanization: Hai^{3} Io^{5} Pen^{3} Ts'ao^{3})) and also a poet. Li Shunxian, their younger sister, was a painter, poet and a concubine of Wang Zongyan, emperor of Former Shu. Their religious background has been suggested as Zoroastrian or East Syriac Christian by Li Guotao and Lo Hsiang-lin, respectively. Li believed that the mention of Weshparkar's weapon in one of Li Shunxian's poems is the evidence of her religious belief. He further argued that the emperor Wang Zongyan became a Zoroastrian under the influence of the Li siblings. Lo inferred that Li Xun was Christian on the grounds that East Syriac Christianity was particularly reliant on medicine for its transmission in Asia. However, both suppositions lack solid evidence and remain to be proven.

== Evidence of Zoroastrianism in Sichuan ==
=== Shu or western Sichuan ===
According to the epitaph of the Zoroastrian sārtpāw, An Jia (518–579), his father An Tujian (Note: See Note i.) served as a governor of Mei Prefecture in western Yizhou. An Jia held the position of commander-in-chief of the Xianbei-led Northern Zhou dynasty (557–581). Yao Chongxin speculated that his father's post as the governor of Mei Prefecture should be during the reign of the Xianbei-led Western Wei dynasty (535–557), after Western Wei's takeover of Shu from the Liang dynasty (502–557) in 553. It is possible that Zoroastrianism was brought into the region by An Tujian. According to Rong Xinjiang, Mei Prefecture might be one of the Sogdian colonies in Yizhou, where Zoroastrian presence was likely to last until well into the Tang dynasty, but limited within the Iranian communities.

In the poem "Ode to Omei" (Note: "Ode to Omei" (traditional Chinese: 遊峨賦; simplified Chinese: 游峨赋; pinyin: Yóu é fù; Sichuanese romanization: Iu^{2} O^{2} Fu^{4})) by Lai Zhide (1525–1604), it mentions the remains of a "bizarre temple of the Qiang people (羗妖廟)" on Mount Omei in the nearby region of Mei Prefecture. In view of the Chinese people's long-lasting miswriting of 祆 (lit. 'Zoroastrian') as 妖 (lit. 'bizarre'), Yao Chongxin believed this "bizarre temple" Lai Zhide visited in the 16th century was actually the remains of a medieval Zoroastrian place of worship. According to him, Iranian peoples had long since disappeared in Sichuan by the time of Lai, and Mei Prefecture and its surrounding area were historically inhabited by the Qiang people, which explains the misattribution.

In volume 45 of the Book of Sui, it is recorded that Yang Xiu (570s–618), the Prince of Shu and the fourth son of Emperor Wen of Sui, was framed by his elder brother Yang Guang, the future emperor Yang of Sui. Emperor Wen issued an edict accusing Yang Xiu of 10 crimes, including an accusation of performing black magic for cursing his father, the emperor, and his younger brother Yang Liang. It states that during the ritual, Yang Xiu invoked a "supernatural army composed of nine hundred million horsemen". Jao Tsung-I was the first to reveal the Zoroastrian undertones behind this message. He pointed out that "nine hundred million" is a symbolic number commonly used by Zoroastrians, thus inferring that during the Sui dynasty, sārtpāws and Zoroastrian priests were not uncommon in the prefectures of Yizhou.

According to the entry "The Princess [of Shu]" in volume 39 of the 16th-century encyclopedia Extended Investigations of the Mountain Hall: "The Emperor of Shu fathered a daughter and ordered Lady Chen to serve as her wet nurse. Lady Chen had a son who was a child at the time. He lived with the two for about ten years and had to leave the palace. Six years later, Lady Chen's son missed the princess and became seriously ill. But it was impossible for them to meet at the palace due to court etiquettes. The princess then arranged to meet him at a Zoroastrian temple. Lady Chen's son fell into a deep slumber when the princess entered the temple. She left her jade ring as a gift for him and left. He woke up and saw the jade ring, and realized that he had missed the opportunity to meet the princess. His deep dolor turned into fire and the temple burned down." This entry caught Kiichirō Kanda's attention in 1928, which made him the first scholar to notice the Zoroastrian presence in medieval Sichuan. Most scholars agree that this happened in the Former Shu (907–925) or Later Shu Kingdom (934–965). The story became the basis for the 14th-century zaju drama Burning of the Zoroastrian Temple. (Note: Original title in traditional Chinese: 火燒祆廟; simplified Chinese: 火烧祆庙; pinyin: Huǒshāo Xiānmiào; Sichuanese romanization: Ho^{3} Shao^{1} Sien^{1} Miao^{4}.)

Professor Li Guotao attributed the popularity of Zoroastrianism in the Former Shu Kingdom to three Persian siblings, namely, the two brothers Li Xun, Li Xuan, and their younger sister Li Shunxian. He further argued that the emperor Wang Zongyan became a Zoroastrian under the influence of the Li siblings. Li Guotao's supposition was rejected by Yao Chongxin due to the lack of solid evidence to support his theory. However, Yao pointed out that the people of Former Shu were no strangers to Zoroastrianism. According to the Spring and Autumn Annals of the Ten Kingdoms: "In August [of the second year of Qiande era (920)], the emperor [Wang Zongyan], accompanied by the chancellor Wang Kai, came to Chengdu to hold a military parade. The emperor wore golden armor, pearl-decorated helmet, and held a bow and an arrow. The crowd present at the event said he looked identical to the Zoroastrian deity of Guankou." This information confirms the popularity of Zoroastrianism among the Former Shu people and the existence of the Guankou Zoroastrian Temple, as well as the cult image of a Zoroastrian deity.

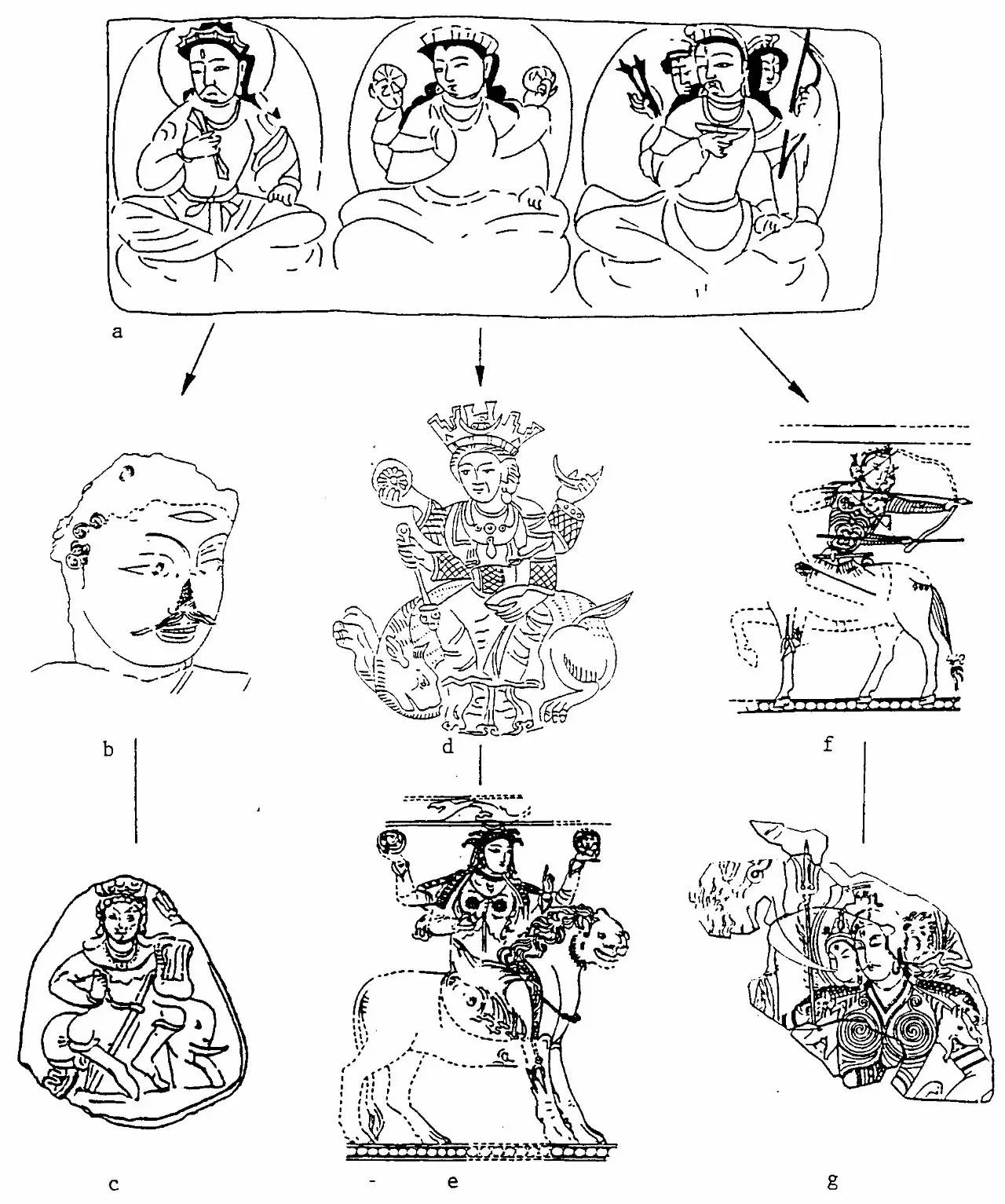
Top: Khotanese panel from Dandan Oilik depicting, from left to right, Ohrmazd, Nana, and Weshparkar. Middle and bottom: representations of the three deities found in Sogdian lands.

Yao Chongxin argued that the temple might have built in the Tang dynasty, and lasted until well into the Song dynasty, since the existence of Zoroastrian temples in Song-era Sichuan has been confirmed by Jao Tsung-I in his article "Investigation of the Festival Songs of the Magi". He also theorized the establishment of a Sogdian colony in Guankou. The image of the Zoroastrian deity mentioned in the Annals seems to be consistent with the Sogdian deity Weshparkar. A Khotanese panel from Dandan Oilik depicts Weshparkar as a figure with three heads and multi arms, holding a bow in one hand and arrows in the other (figure a on the right). A fragmentary mural from Kalai Kahkaha I (ruins of a palace of the Principality of Ushrusana) in the archaeological site of Bunjikat shows an archery Weshparkar wearing armor and a helmet (figure f). His depiction in one of the Penjikent murals shows the deity with three heads, wearing armor and a helmet, and holding a trident (figure g). The tutelary deity Erlang Shen, otherwise known as Erlang of Guankou and the Lord of Sichuan, seems to have a strong link to Weshparkar in terms of appearance and attributes. Nevertheless, Professor Hou Hui believed that "since the cult of Erlang Shen originated in Sichuan, a region with a Zoroastrian cultural background, and the deity in question shares many common features with Tishtrya, e.g., both are associated with water, and the ram sacrifice was the central part of their cults. Thus it is speculated that the cult of Erlang Shen may be derived from the cult of Tishtrya."

=== Ba or eastern Sichuan ===
The region of Ba, named after the ancient state of Ba, covers roughly the modern-day Chongqing city. The spread of Zoroastrianism in this realm seems to be limited to the Three Gorges area. The festival songs of the magi were nevertheless particularly popular in this region during medieval times.

The Tales for Rainy Nights by Autumn Lamp (Note: Tales for Rainy Nights by Autumn Lamp (traditional Chinese: 夜雨秋燈錄; simplified Chinese: 夜雨秋灯录; pinyin: Yèyǔ qiūdēng lù)) by Xuan Ding (1832–1880) recounts a somewhat bizarre story: "During the Ten Kingdoms period (Former [907–925] or Later Shu [934–965] in Sichuan), a Buddhist monk in Jiangbei adopted a girl born of a deer, she was thus named the deer girl. She was kept in a secret room from the public. Sixteen years later on the festival day of the bathing of the Buddha, people gathered in the temple to attend the celebration. And everyone's jaw dropped when the deer girl suddenly broke out of her room. Some scoundrels in the crowd booed, asking, 'why does a monk keep a beautiful girl hidden? Is she your petal-scattering maiden? Is she your Prakṛti? Fortunately, gods and buddhas revealed the inappropriateness of your lifestyle as a monk, otherwise, would not the sacred fire of Wushan Zoroastrian Temple spread here to destroy us all?'" This outlandish tale hints at the existence of a Zoroastrian temple in Wushan during the Former and Later Shu period, and this temple probably still existed during the Manchu-led Qing dynasty (1644–1912), for it was mentioned in a Qing-era poem.

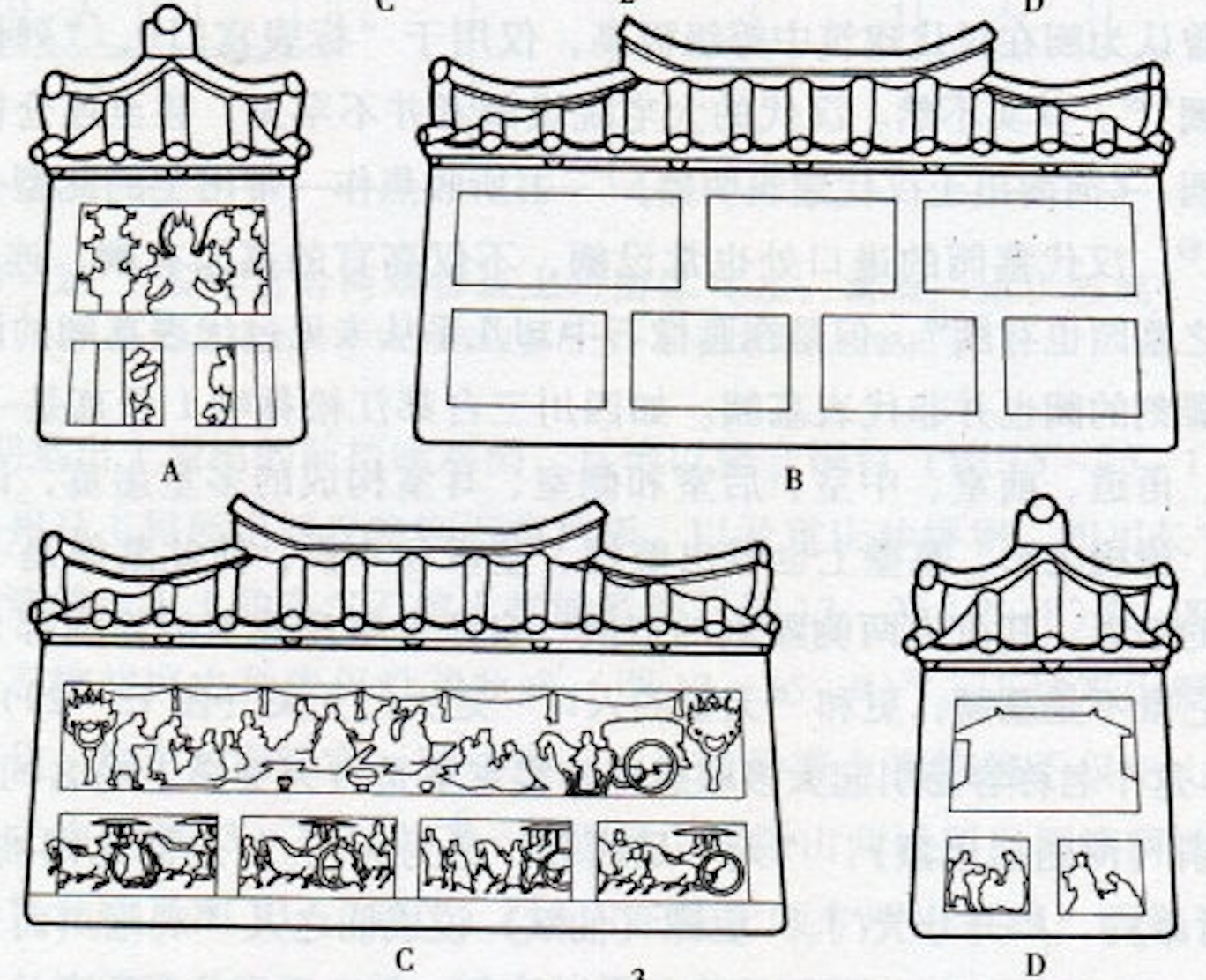
House-shaped sarcophagus from Leshan, western Sichuan, 1st–3rd century. Wu Hung argued that this type of coffin originated in Sichuan and was preferred by the Sogdians and Xianbei. See, for example, the 6th-century sarcophagus of the Sogdian Zoroastrian sārtpāw Wirkak.

A house-shaped pottery sarcophagus dated to the Northern Song dynasty (960–1127) was unearthed in Tomb No. 8 of Laowuchang Cemetery in Wushan. This type of coffins are generally Zoroastrian ossuaries and often found in Sogdian tombs. The outer wall of the sarcophagus is decorated with palmettes which were a common motif in Zoroastrian funerary art.

According to the American art historian Wu Hung, house-shaped sarcophagus originated in Sichuan during the Han dynasty (202 BC – 220 AD), and this type of sarcophagus symbolizes some sort of ethnic connection, since it was not used by the indigenous Chinese who had lived in central and southern China, but was preferred by the Sogdians, Xianbei, and other people of Chinese or non-Chinese ancestry who had immigrated to northern China from the West.

In the Exhaustive Description of the Empire by Wang Xiangzhi (1163–1230), it is recorded that, in the year 843, an edict issued by Emperor Wuzong of Tang ordered the resettlement of fifty-six surrendered Uyghurs to this frontier region of eastern Yizhou. Based on this information, the archaeologists speculated that the house-shaped sarcophagus discovered in Laowuchang is likely to belong to one of the descendants of the above-mentioned Uyghurs. They were probably Zoroastrians and adopted this particular type of coffin to assert their unique identity.

== See also ==
Religion in Sichuan

- Christianity in Sichuan
  - Church of the East in Sichuan
- Islam in Sichuan

Related topics

- Hu (people)
- Iranians in China
- Sogdian Daēnās
- Zoroastrianism in Iran
