= Kardarigan =

Kardarigan may refer to:

- Kardarigan (6th century), Sassanid Persian general of the late 6th century
- Kardarigan (7th century) (died 629), Sassanid Persian general of the early 7th century
