= Battle of Sisauranon (589) =

- Part of Byzantine–Sasanian War of 572–591
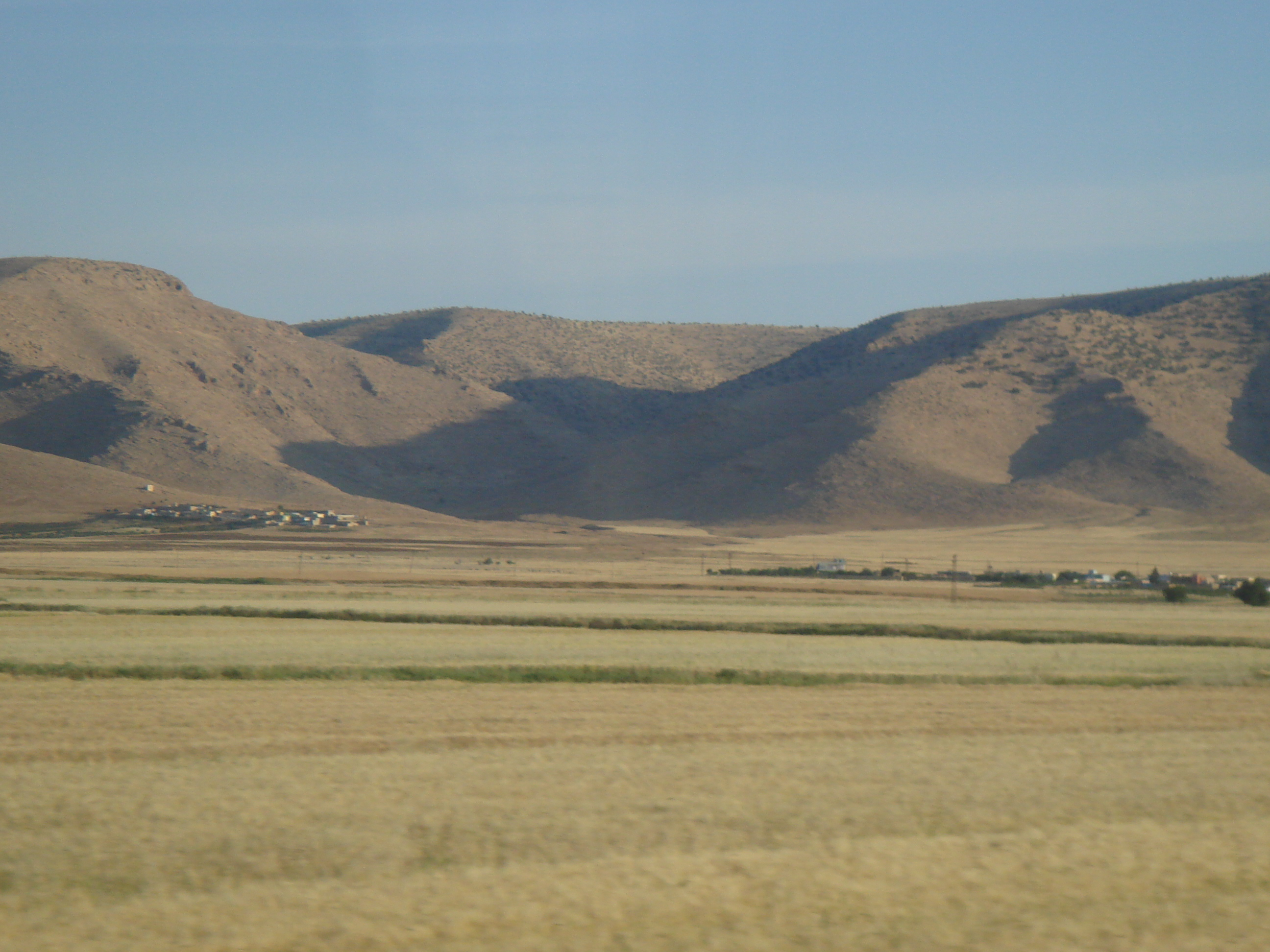
- View of the countryside in modern Mardin, near to the location of Sisauranon
Date	Autumn 589
Location	Near Sisauranon, Northern Arbayistan (modern Mardin)
Result	Byzantine victory

Belligerents
Byzantine Empire	Sasanian Empire

Commanders and leaders
Comentiolus (WIA); Heraclius the Elder	Farhad †

Strength
Large army	Large army

Casualties and losses
Light	Very heavy

The Battle of Sisauranon or Battle of Sisarbanon was an engagement between Byzantine forces led by Comentiolus and Sasanian forces led by Farhad in Mesopotamia, during the War for the Caucasus. The battle ended in a victory for the Byzantines.

== Background ==
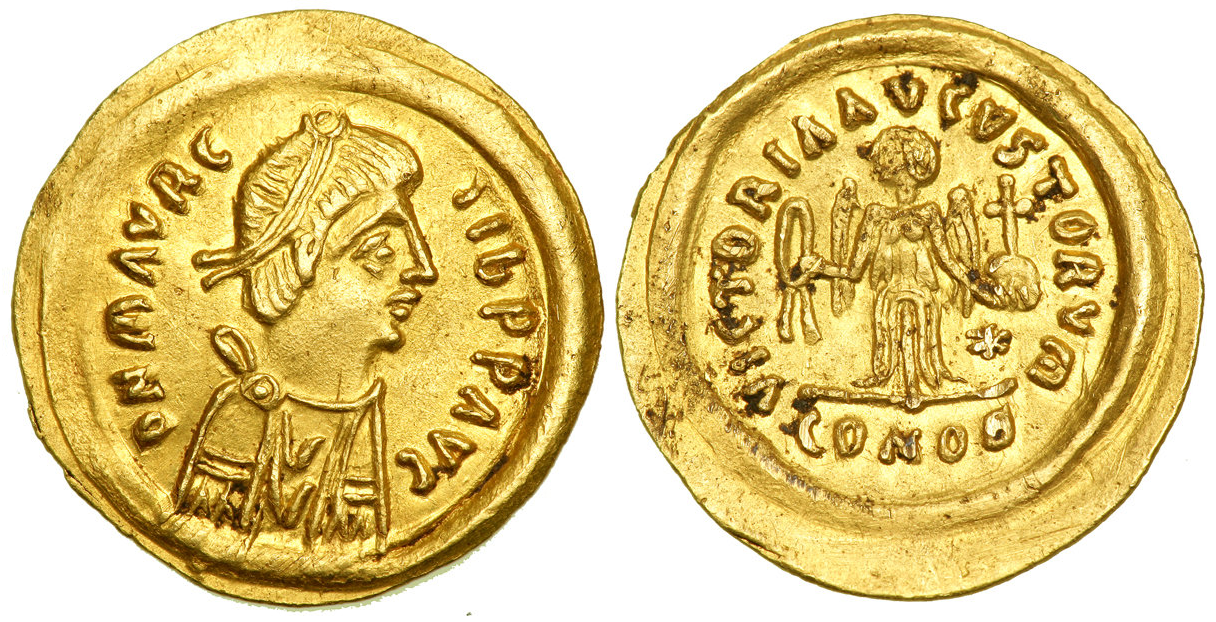
Solidus depicting Emperor Maurice

In early 589, the Sasanians had gained control of the city of Martyropolis via the assistance of a turncoat Byzantine officer called Sittas. Philippicus, the Magister Militum per Orientem, besieged the city shortly thereafter, but could not retake it despite an intense siege. A Sasanian relief army under Mahbod and Farhad also managed to reinforce the Persian garrison. As a result of Philippicus' lack of progress, Emperor Maurice appointed Comentiolus as the new Magister Militum and dispatched him to take over command of operations against Persia.

== Battle of Sisauranon ==
To add pressure against the Persians in Martyropolis, the Byzantines launched an invasion of Sasanian Arbayistan, directed towards the city of Nisibis. Comentiolus advanced into the region from the north, but was opposed in a pitched battle by the Persians at Sisauranon, east of Nisibis. Exact figures for the armies are not provided by the sources, but as Farhad had recently combined the Sasanian army stationed at Nisibis with units previously serving in Armenia, the Persian army was significant, likely similar in size to the invading Byzantine army.

The two main accounts detailing the battle are provided by Evagrius Scholasticus and Theophylact Simocatta, though the two have a very different treatment of the Byzantine general Comentiolus. In Theophylact's account, Comentiolus fled towards Theodosiopolis once the battle commenced and abandoned his men. Theophylact credits the restoration of the situation to Heraclius, due to his bravery and skill as a warrior. In Evagrius' account, Comentiolus fought bravely, nearly being killed in the fighting when the Persians unhorsed him, before a bodyguard came to his aid and carried the general to safety on his horse. It has been noted by historian Michael Whitby that Theophylact Simocatta often denigrates Comentiolus' military performance to portray him negatively. In particular it is unlikely that Comentiolus could have fled to Theodosiopolis from Sisauranon, as distance between the two required several days of travel and would have taken him past Sasanian-held Nisibis. Theophylact wrote during the reign of Heraclius' son, leading him to deride Comentiolus, in order to credit the achievement to the ruling dynasty of his day. Ultimately Evagrius' account is considered superior by modern scholars. It is probable that the Sasanians initially forced back the Byzantine line under Heraclius, a detail which Theophylact omits, only for a counterattack by reserves under Comentiolus to turn the tide and decide the outcome of the battle.

Though Comentiolus was injured, his leadership proved successful and the Byzantine army won a complete victory. The leadership of the Sasanian army was wiped out, with Farhad being one of several commanders who fell in the battle. Additionally, myriads of Persian soldiers were killed, with those who escaped the catastrophe fleeing to Nisibis, while the Byzantines stormed the Persian camp and captured the loot and women within on the day following the battle. Coupled with the successes of Byzantine forces under Romanus in Transcaucasia earlier that year, the victory at Sisauranon proved decisive. It enabled Comentiolus to capture the strategic fortress of Akbas, while tightening their blockade of the Persians in Martyropolis.

== Aftermath ==
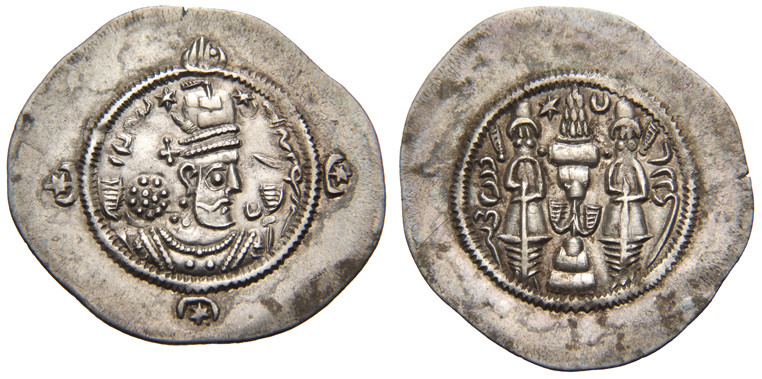
Silver coin depicting Hormizd IV

A further strategic consequence of the battle concerned the survivors of the Persian army. After reaching Nisibis, the remnants of the Sasanian force feared the prospects of punishment by Shahenshah Hormizd IV. Prior to the battle, Hormizd threatened to execute them should they allow their commanders to fall to the enemy. The economizing measures of Hormizd in cutting soldiers' salary also diminished their loyalty to the dynasty. In this situation, the actions of Bahram Chobin presented an opportunity to the soldiers in Nisibis. Following his recent defeat against the Byzantines at the Battle of the Araxes, Bahram launched an insurrection against Hormizd when the latter attempted to dismiss him. After making oaths to overthrow Hormizd, the troops at Nisibis deserted their post and marched to join Bahram when he reached the Great Zab. This led to the escalation of the revolt into a full-scale civil war in Persia, leading to the deposition of Hormizd and flight of his son Khosrow to Byzantine territory.

== Bibliography ==
- Decker, Michael J. (2022). The Sasanian empire at War. Persia, Rome and the rise of Islam. Westholme Publishing, LLC. ISBN 978-1-59416-692-1.
- Whitby, Michael; Whitby, Mary (1986). The History of Theophylact Simocatta: An English Translation with Introduction. Oxford University Press.
- Whitby, Michael (1988). The Emperor Maurice and his Historian Theophylact Simocatta on Persian and Balkan Warfare. Clarendon Press. ISBN 978-0198229452.
- Syvänne, Ilkka (2022). The Military History of Late Rome AD 565-602. Pen and Sword. ISBN 978-1-5267-9395-9.
- Greatrex, Geoffrey; Lieu, Samuel N. C. (2002), The Roman Eastern Frontier and the Persian Wars (Part II, 363–630 AD), Routledge, ISBN 978-0-415-00342-1
