= Mahbod =

Mahbod (in Persian مهبد) is a given name and surname. It may refer to: Mahbod Harandizadeh

== Given name ==
- Mahbod (envoy), 6th-century Iranian ambassador and military officer from the House of Suren
- Mahbod Moghadam (born 1982), Iranian-American internet entrepreneur, co-founder of Everipedia
- Mahbod Seraji, Iranian-American author and novelist

== Surname ==
- Samson Mahbod (born 1989), Canadian-American professional ice hockey player of Iranian descent
