= Acbas =

Acbas (Akbas) or Arbas was a Sasanian fortress built in the 570s in Arzanene district, Armenia right on the Roman-Persian border. It was perched on a hill on the east bank of the Nymphius river (modern Batman River), roughly opposite Martyropolis. It was several miles distant from the fortresses of Aphoum and Chlomaron.

In 583 the Roman general Aulus or John Mystacon invested Acbas and began a blockade. The garrison asked for help using signal fires. The Persian force under Kardarigan that was besieging the nearby fortress of Aphumon came for assistance and repelled the Romans, who retired across Nymphius into the Roman territories. As a result, Emperor Maurice recalled the general and replaced him with Philippicus as the commander of the armies in the East. According to Theophylact, the Persians were victorious. However, according to John, by the end of the year, Acbas fell to the Romans who destroyed it after capturing it.
