= Apsich =

Apsich or Aspik (fl. 580) was a Hun military leader in the Byzantine Empire.

Apsich was a professional soldier who gained high command in the Byzantine Empire. He fought in the Byzantine–Sasanian War of 572–591. When Philippicus fell ill in 585, he entrusted his army to him and another commander. He commanded a contingent of horse-archers at the Battle of Solachon.

== Etymology ==
His name could be an Alan-Turkic hybrid. *Apsïq, formed by Alanic *apsa, "horse" and Turkish -°k, -°q, "little horse."
