= Sabao =

Chinese title

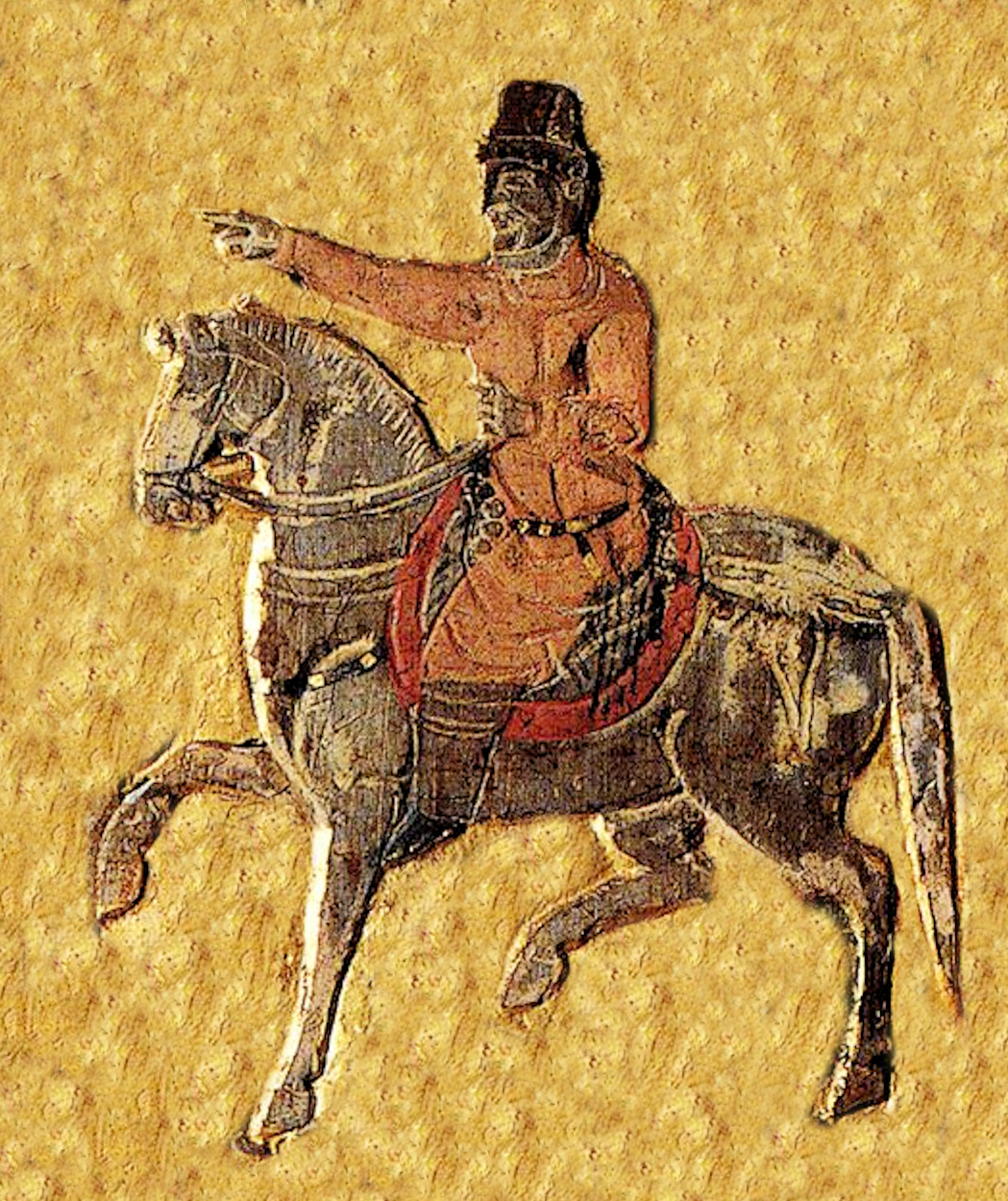
The Sogdian Sabao An Jia on his horse, as he appears in one of the panels of his tomb. 579 CE

Sabao (Chinese: 薩保; pinyin: sàbǎo; lit. 'Protector', 'Guardian'), or sārtpāw in Sogdian, was an official Chinese title in the 5th-7th centuries CE, used for government-appointed leaders of the Sogdian immigrant-merchant community. The word sabao is derived from the Sogdian word sārtpāw, "caravan leader". Sabaos also often had titles of "Prefects", with regional responsibilities, in the Chinese administration : An Jia was Sabao and Grand Governor (大都督, Dàdūdū) of Tong Prefecture.

They were in charge of commercial affairs for foreign merchants from Middle Asia doing businesses in China, as well as Zoroastrian affairs. Various Sabaos are known from their epitaphs, such as An Jia, Wirkak or Yu Hong.

The tombs of the Sabaos in China are among the most lavish of the period in this country, and are only slightly inferior to Imperial tombs, suggesting that they were among the wealthiest members of the population.

== Tombs of Sabaos ==
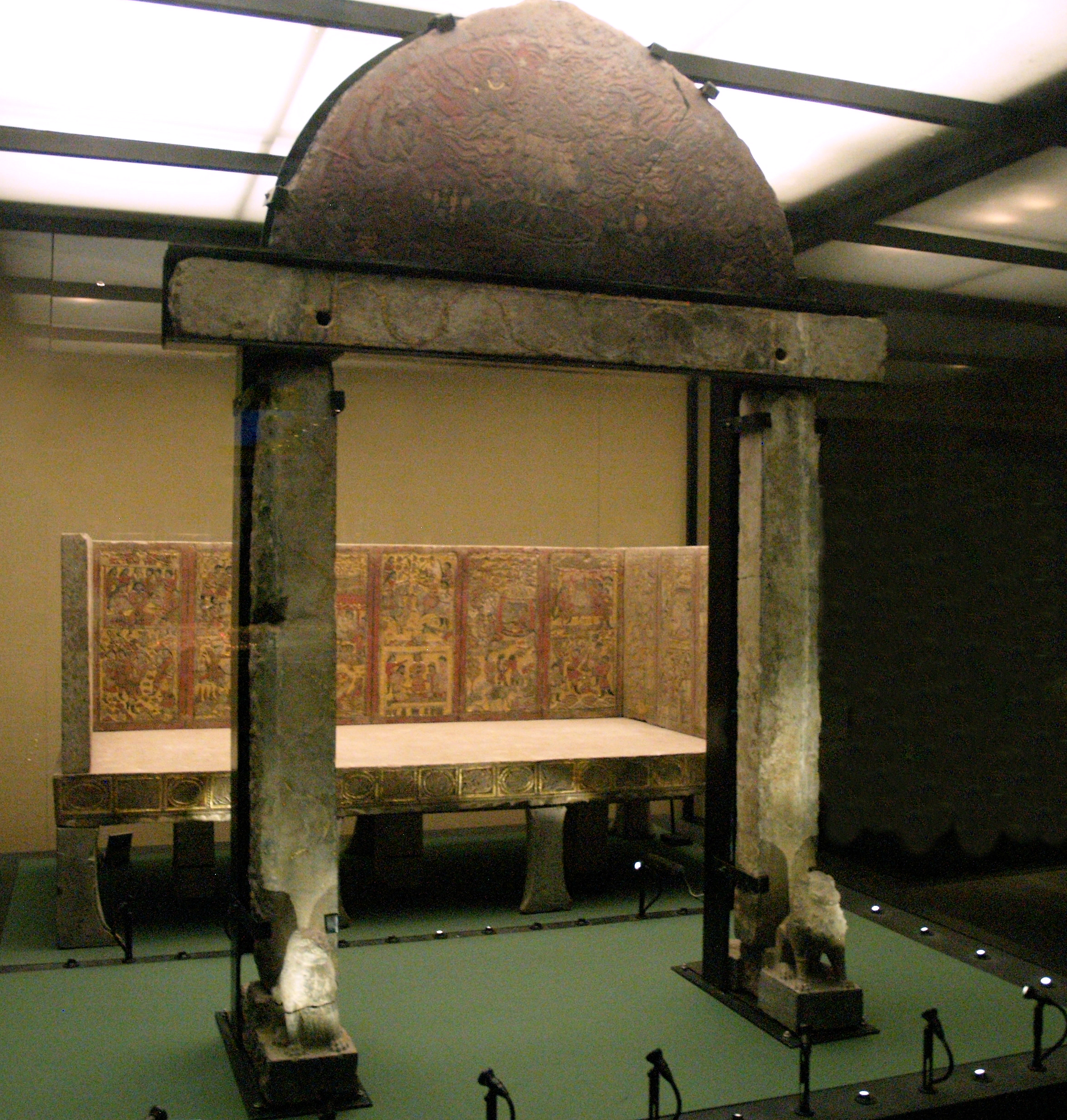
Tomb of An Jia, 579 CE, Shaanxi Provincial Institute of Archaeology.

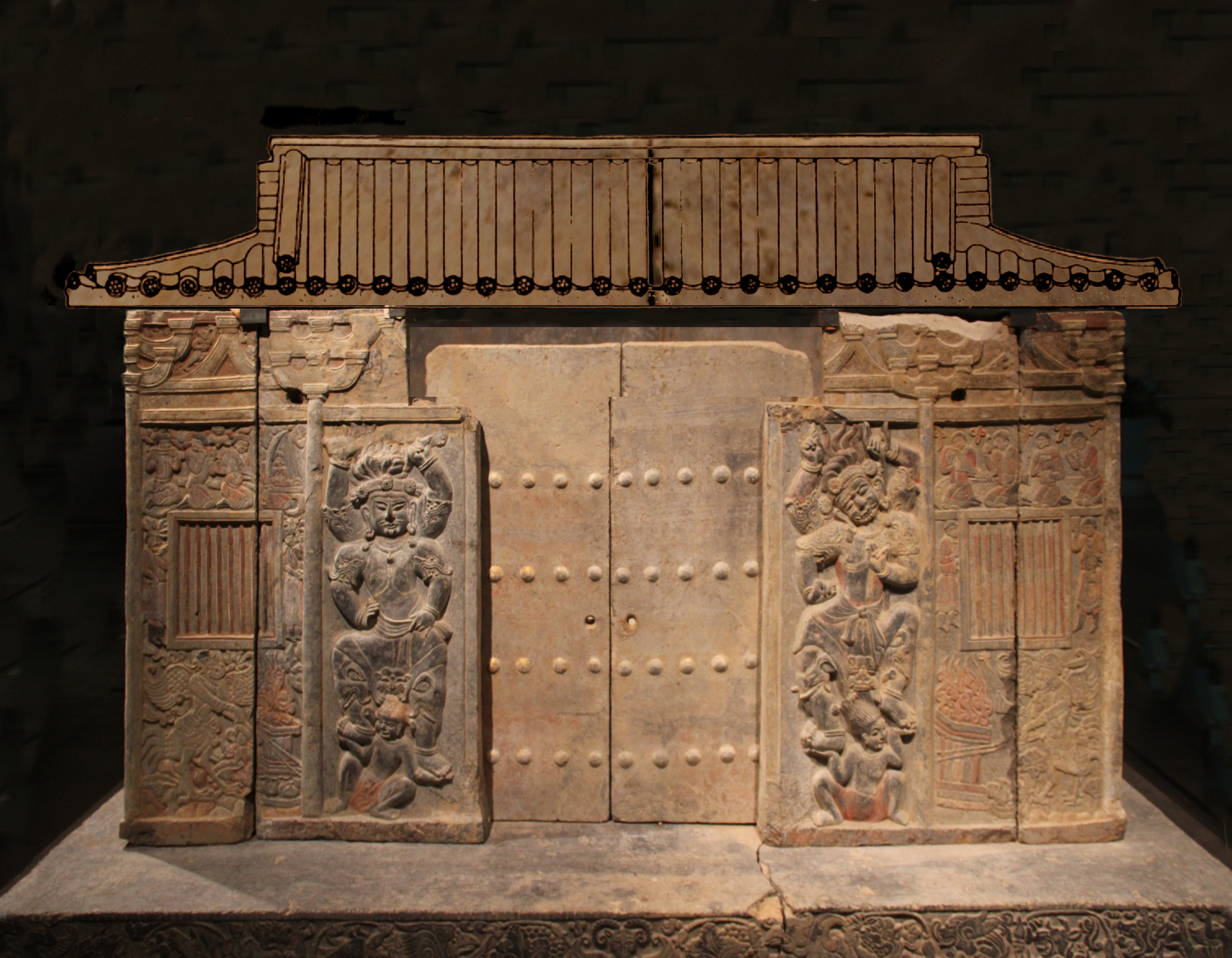
The tomb of Wirkak, 580 CE, Xi'an City Museum

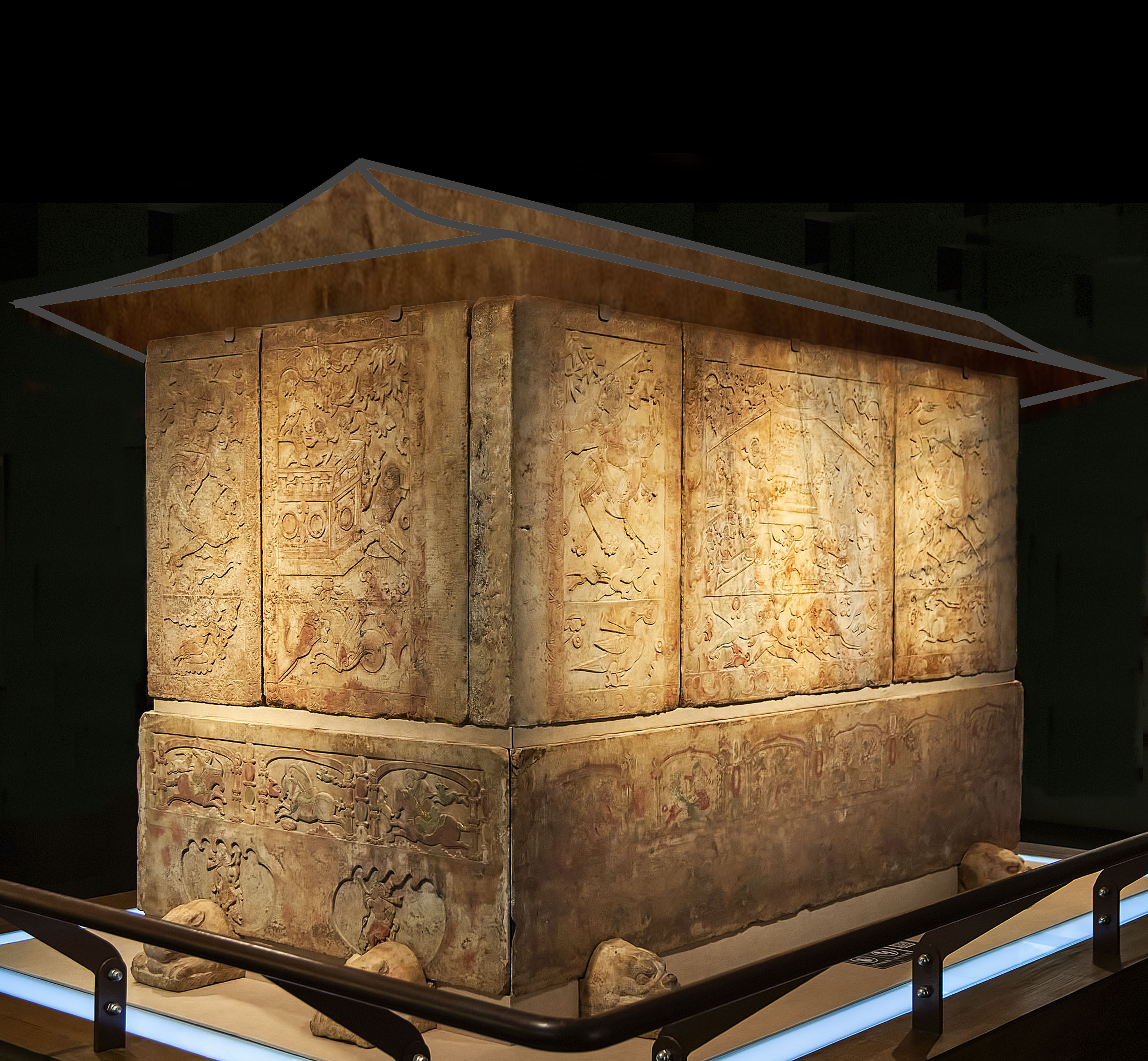
Tomb of Yu Hong, 592 CE, Shanxi Museum.
