= Heraclius the Elder =

Byzantine general

Heraclius the Elder Patrikios
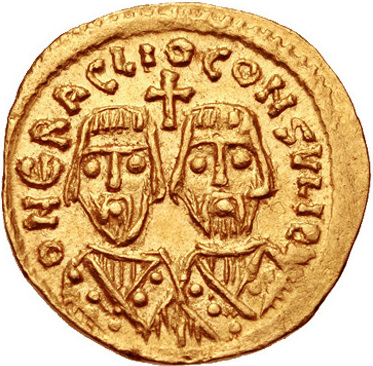
- Gold solidus struck during the revolt of the Heraclii, depicting Heraclius the Elder and his son, the future Emperor Heraclius, wearing consular robes.

Consul of the Byzantine Empire (disputed)
- In office 608 – 610 with Heraclius the Younger
- Succeeded by: Heraclius the Younger

Exarch of Africa
- In office c. 598 – 610

Magister militum per Armeniam
- In office c. 595

Personal details
- Died: c. 610
- Spouse: Epiphania
- Children: Heraclius; Theodore; Maria

Military service
- Allegiance: Byzantine Empire
- Years of service: c. 580 – 610
- Battles/wars: Byzantine-Sasanian War of 572-591; Battle of Solachon; Battle of Sisauranon; Heraclian revolt

Heraclius the Elder (Greek: Ἡράκλειος, romanized: Hērákleios; died 610) was a Byzantine Roman general and the father of Byzantine Roman emperor Heraclius (r. 610–641). Heraclius the Elder distinguished himself in the war against the Sassanid Persians in the 580s. As a subordinate general (or hypostrategos), Heraclius served under the command of Philippicus during the Battle of Solachon and possibly served under Comentiolus during the Battle of Sisauranon. Circa 595, Heraclius the Elder is mentioned as a magister militum per Armeniam sent by Emperor Maurice (r. 582–602) to quell an Armenian rebellion led by Samuel Vahewuni and Atat Khorkhoruni. Around 600, he was made the exarch of Africa and in 608, he rebelled with his son against the usurper Phocas (r. 602–610). Using Africa as a base, the younger Heraclius managed to overthrow Phocas, beginning the Heraclian dynasty, which would rule Byzantium for a century. Heraclius the Elder died soon after receiving news of his son's accession to the Byzantine throne.

== Origin ==
Heraclius the Elder was assumed to be of Armenian origin by some modern historians and presumably bilingual (Armenian and Greek) at an early age. His Armenian origin is deduced by a passage of Theophylact Simocatta, which was misinterpreted as considering him a native of Byzantine Armenia. Anthony Kaldellis argues that "there is not a single primary source that says that Heraclius was an Armenian" and that the assertion is based on an erroneous reading of Theophylact Simocatta. Furthermore, these potential exaggerated and overemphasised distant ancestries are of little significance, as Heraclius identified as Romaios (Roman) and was ethnically Romaios. In a letter, Priscus, a general who had replaced Heraclius the Elder, wrote to him "to leave the army and return to his own city in Armenia". Kaldellis interprets it as the command headquarters of Heraclius the Elder, and not his hometown. Heraclius the Elder's city is not specifically mentioned. Mary and Michael Whitby suggest that Heraclius the Elder was at the time the magister militum per Armeniam. If so, "his city" was Theodosiopolis (modern Erzurum), the headquarters of the Roman forces in Armenia. As the chief military stronghold along the northeastern border of the empire, Theodosiopolis held an important strategic location that was contested in wars between the Byzantines and Persians. Emperors Anastasius I (r. 491–518) and Justinian I (r. 527–565) both refortified the city and built new defenses during their reigns.

Nothing is known of the specific ancestry of Heraclius the Elder, but this has not prevented modern historians from speculating on the matter. Cyril Mango has supported a theory which suggests that he was a namesake descendant of Heraclius of Edessa, a 5th-century Roman general. A passage from Sebeos's History has been understood to suggest an Arsacid origin of Heraclius the Elder. This theory was strongly supported by Cyril Toumanoff, while considered likely by Alexander Vasiliev and Irfan Shahîd. John of Nikiû and Constantine Manasses seem to consider his son, Heraclius the Younger, to be a Cappadocian, which might indicate his place of birth rather than actual ancestry.

== Family ==
The Historia syntomos of Patriarch Nikephoros I of Constantinople mentions a single brother of Heraclius the Elder, named Gregoras, who was the father of Nicetas. Theophanes the Confessor mentions Epiphania as the mother of Emperor Heraclius, thus wife of Heraclius the Elder. Heraclius the Elder is mentioned as the father of Emperor Heraclius in several sources, including Theophylact, John of Nikiû, Nikephoros I, Theophanes, Agapius the historian, the Suda, Georgios Kedrenos, Joannes Zonaras, Michael the Syrian, the Chronicle of 1234 and Nikephoros Kallistos Xanthopoulos. In contrast, there is no source mentioning him in the same sentence as the siblings of Emperor Heraclius. That he was their father can be safely assumed, though.

The best-attested sibling of Heraclius the Younger was arguably Theodore. Maria, sister of Heraclius the Younger, is mentioned by Nikephoros I and identified as the mother of Martina, whom Heraclius the Younger would go on to marry. Both Kedrenos and Michael the Syrian consider Martina to have been a daughter of an unnamed brother of Heraclius the Younger, thus casting some doubt on the precise relation. Finally, Theophanes briefly mentions another Gregoras as a brother of Heraclius the Younger on the occasion of the former's death at Heliopolis (modern Baalbek) circa 652/653. This is the only mention of this sibling. Theophanes, however, might have misunderstood the relationship between Gregoras and the emperor.

== Career ==
=== Under Philippicus ===
Heraclius the Elder is first mentioned in 586 as a general serving under Philippicus during the Roman–Persian War of 572–591. Heraclius the Elder commanded the center of the Byzantine army at the Battle of Solachon in spring 586. Following the battle, he was sent on a scouting mission to confirm the rumour of the arrival of Persian reinforcements.

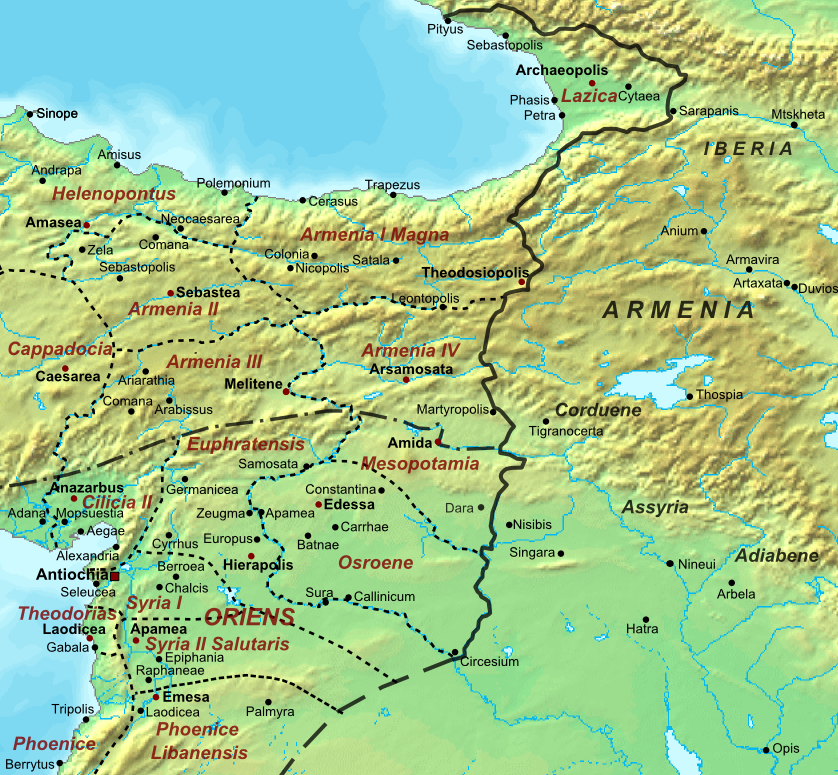
The Roman-Persian frontier between 565 and 591.

The Byzantine force went on to invade Arzanene. Philippicus besieged Chlomaron, the chief city of the area. At this point, Jovius and Maruthas, two local leaders, defected to the Byzantines. They promised to help locate the ideal positions for building impregnable forts that would control the passage through the Taurus Mountains and Hakkâri, allowing the Byzantines to control the routes that connected Arzanene with Persarmenia and Lower Mesopotamia. Philippicus assigned Heraclius the Elder, noted at this point as his second-in-command (hypostrategos), to follow the guides to the strong points indicated.

Twenty men accompanied Heraclius the Elder in the mission. They left without their armour and their party soon encountered Kardarigan leading a new Persian army. Theophylact notes that "Kardarigan was marching against the Romans, having enrolled throngs, who were not soldiers but men inexperienced in martial clamour; he had in addition assembled a herd of baggage animals and camels, and was moving forwards." Nevertheless, Kardarigan attempted to attack Heraclius' ill-equipped unit, and Heraclius had to escape by moving from ridge to ridge. By night, he sent a messenger to warn Philippicus of the approaching threat.

Philippicus' forces fled in disorder back into Roman territory. He managed to reach Amida and then set about restoring the old forts on Mount Izala. There, possibly due to illness, he handed over command of his army to Heraclius. Theophylact narrates:

"He [Philippicus] gave part of the army to Heraclius, since he was himself overwhelmed by pain and unable to fight. Heraclius marshaled his soldiery and camped opposite the foothills of Izala, or rather the banks of the river Tigris. Accordingly Heraclius left Thamanon [a location on the eastern banks of the Tigris], advanced towards the southern parts of Media, and ravaged the whole of that area. He even traversed the Tigris and urged the army forward, burning everything of importance in that part of Media. Then he re-entered the Roman state, circled past Theodosiopolis, and once again rejoined the men with Philippicus."

— The History of Theophylact Simocatta, Book II

Theophylact indicates Philipiccus and Heraclius the Elder wintered together at Theodosiopolis.

In spring 587, Philippicus was again ill, and unable to campaign in person. He assigned two-thirds of his army to Heraclius the Elder and the remainder to generals Theodore and Andreas, and sent them to raid Persian territory. Heraclius the Elder besieged an unnamed strong fort, using his siege engines day and night until it fell. After installing a garrison in the captured fort, Theophanes the Confessor reports that Heraclius the Elder proceeded to join General Theodore at the siege of Beioudaes, but this seems to be an error. Theophanes seems to have misunderstood the relevant passage of Theophylact which has Theodore and Andreas joining at that siege.

In late 587, Philippicus planned to return to Constantinople, leaving Heraclius the Elder in charge of the army for the winter season. Heraclius the Elder took measures to restore discipline to the troops. According to Theophylact, "Heraclius inflicted penalties for desertion on the vagrants from the Roman force; and those who had bidden farewell to labour, and who were aimlessly wandering hither and thither, were converted to good sense by punishments." In early 588, Emperor Maurice (r. 582–602) replaced Philippicus with Priscus. Philippicus wrote to Heraclius the Elder, ordering him to leave the army in the care of Narses and return to Armenia. But the same letters notified the soldiers of an imperial decree which reduced their pay by one-quarter. This led to a mutiny of the troops, who refused to follow Priscus' orders. The mutiny only ended when the order was rescinded and Philippicus was re-appointed as commander of the eastern army.

=== Under Comentiolus ===
Heraclius the Elder resurfaces a year later, under the command of Comentiolus, in the Battle of Sisarbanon (autumn 589), in the vicinity of Nisibis. According to the account of Theophylact, Comentiolus supposedly fled towards Theodosiopolis (modern Ra's al-'Ayn) while the battle was still ongoing. Heraclius the Elder took charge of the remaining troops and led them to victory. Theophylact, however, lived and wrote during the reign of Heraclius the Younger, and is strongly biased in favour of his father. His account is thus suspected of exaggerating or even inventing Comentiolus' cowardice with the aim of glorifying Heraclius the Elder. The contemporary Evagrius Scholasticus, for instance, credits Comentiolus with being in the thick of combat, and does not mention Heraclius the Elder at all.

=== Armenian revolt ===
Heraclius the Elder is mentioned again circa 595 as magister militum per Armeniam, probably succeeding John Mystacon. The history of Sebeos provides the main account of his term. He was sent by Maurice to face Armenian rebels led by Samuel Vahewuni and Atat Khorkhoruni. Heraclius the Elder was assisted by Hamazasp Mamikonian.

"Then [the emperor] ordered the general Heraclius who was located in the country of Armenia to take his troops and go against [the rebels] in battle...Then [the rebels] looted whatever they found, taking a great deal of booty, and departed to the secure Korduats' country. They wanted to have the stronghold there. Now the Byzantine forces with general Heraclius and Hamazasp Mamikonean pursued them. [The rebels] approached the stronghold, crossing by bridge the river called Jermay (which is styled Daniel's bridge). They cut down the bridge and fortified themselves in a pass where they held the site of the bridge. [The Byzantines] were on the [opposite] riverbank wondering what to do. Because they were unable to find a ford, they wanted to depart. But unexpectedly, a traveling priest strayed into their midst. They seized him and said: 'If you do not show us the river's ford, we will kill you.' [The traveller] took the forces and showed them the ford [at a place] below where they were. All the troops crossed the river. Some of them held [watch over] the stronghold, others the bridgehead. [Some] held the mouth of the valley, others entered the stronghold and battled with them. The devastation was enormous, and [the rebels] were worn out...Killed in the battle were Nerses, Vstam, and Samuel, who killed quite a few [warriors] around them in fight. But Sargis and Varaz Nerseh were arrested along with some others. They were taken to the city of Karin and later beheaded. When they were about to be beheaded, Varaz Nerseh said to Sargis: 'Let's cast lots to see whom they kill first.' But Sargis replied: 'I am an old, blame-worthy man. I beg you, grant me this little respite, that I not see your death.' So they beheaded him first. Now T'eodoros Trpatuni fled to the court of the Iranian king (Khosrau II), for refuge. But [the king] ordered him bound and delivered into the hands of his enemies to be put to death. And [the king] visited severe misfortunes upon him."

— History of Sebeos, Chapters 6-7

Heraclius the Elder seems to have been replaced by Suren. His service in Armenia was brief, but arguably reinforced his ties to the country.

=== Exarch of Africa ===
Heraclius the Elder is next mentioned in 608 as Patrician and Exarch of Africa. According to Patriarch Nikephoros, Heraclius the Elder had been appointed to the position by Maurice prior to the latter's deposition and death in 602. He might have replaced Innocentius, a temporary exarch appointed between 598 and 600. The appointment suggests that Heraclius the Elder enjoyed the favor of Maurice and would have reason to remain loyal to him. Heraclius the Elder and his African court notably lamented the death and execution of Maurice and posthumously praised the fallen emperor.

The exarchs of Africa were effectively Governor-Generals with both civilian and military powers. Their seat of power was Carthage. Historians of the late 19th and early 20th centuries ascribed much significance to this appointment, even suggesting it would require prominent ties between Heraclius the Elder and Africa or the wider Western Roman Empire. Later historians pointed out, however, that this appointment was part of a wider pattern. In the 6th century, several prominent Byzantine military commanders had started their careers in the eastern regions of the Empire, often in the vicinity of Upper Mesopotamia. Then they were transferred to Byzantine North Africa at some point in their respective careers. There is therefore no indication that this rotation from the eastern to the western provinces was unusual.

Charles Diehl regarded early 7th-century Byzantine Africa to have undergone an economic and demographic decline, being under constant threat by hostile Berbers. Later historians, however, have had to revise this picture in light of archaeological evidence: the Exarchate was among the most affluent areas of the Byzantine Empire, though of lesser wealth and significance than Egypt. It seems to have seen much less warfare than the Balkans, Mesopotamia, and the Caucasus did in that era, thus allowing its residents a safer way of life. There is evidence of ongoing trade between Byzantine Africa and Frankish Gaul during the 7th century. Agriculture was thriving, particularly in the vicinity of the Medjerda River. The production of grain, olive oil, and wine kept the local population well-fed and probably supplied their maritime trade. Fishing seems to have been another thriving field. The local elite seems to have invested in the building of churches. The main testaments to their existence and activities are examples of funerary art, particularly mosaics. Heraclius the Elder seems to have established ties with this elite. His son, Heraclius the Younger, married his first wife Eudokia during the 7th century. Her father was Rogas, a landowner in the Exarchate.

=== Revolt against Phocas ===
In 608, the Exarchate of Africa under Heraclius the Elder revolted against Emperor Phocas. The subsequent campaign against Phocas was portrayed by Byzantine historians as avenging the death of Maurice, which might have been part of the motivation for this revolt. The other part, however, would be what Walter Emil Kaegi termed "cold political calculations": Carthage was at a safe distance from Constantinople and Phocas could not easily launch an attack against it. The relative wealth of the Exarchate of Africa could well enough finance a revolt. Phocas's regime arguably needed the grain and revenues from Africa, while the Exarchate sustained itself with relative ease. Meanwhile, the Persian shah Khosrau II had secured control of Dara and was mobilizing his troops for a large-scale invasion into Byzantine territories. News of this campaign could have well reached Heraclius the Elder. With Phocas facing two separate military fronts, the emperor would be unable to concentrate the majority of his troops on either one of them, encouraging Heraclius the Elder of his chances to succeed in this confrontation.

After their revolt, Heraclius the Elder and Heraclius the Younger were proclaimed joint consuls. There is no indication in the sources on how this was achieved, i.e., whether Heraclius the Elder was self-appointed or officially proclaimed by the Senate of Carthage, "whose members had no legal right to designate a Roman consul". Nevertheless, the significance of the proclamation was evident. No private individuals had been proclaimed consuls since the reign of Justinian I (r. 527–565). Since then it was merely another title exclusively used by the Byzantine emperors. By this proclamation, Heraclius the Elder was arguably making a first step towards becoming emperor himself, while legitimizing his connection to the long history of Rome. The mints of Carthage and later Alexandria produced coins depicting Heraclius the Elder and his namesake son wearing consular robes.

John of Antioch and the Patriarch Nikephoros both report that Heraclius the Elder maintained correspondence with Priscus, the Count of the Excubitors and former commander of the army. By that time, Priscus was the son-in-law of Phocas but reportedly held a grudge against the emperor. He allegedly promised Heraclius the Elder support in case of a rebellion and confirmed it once the rebellion had started. The story is somewhat suspect. While there was major dissension in Constantinople and Priscus did in time defect to Heraclius the Elder, there is nothing to suggest that Priscus helped incite the revolt. Patriarch Nikephoros reports that Heraclius the Elder held a council with his brother Gregoras before proclaiming his revolt, possibly indicating that Gregoras was acting as his advisor. He also reports that Gregoras hoped to promote his son Nicetas to the throne, although this is considered unlikely at best by modern historians.

The situation in 609–610 was quickly becoming dire for Phocas and his loyalists. Their defense against the Sassanid Empire had failed. There were Persian forces in Mesopotamia, Armenia, Syria and the Anatolian provinces. Rebel Byzantine forces held Africa and Egypt. Slavs were occupying northern Illyricum. In Thessalonica and various towns of Anatolia and Syria, the Blues and Greens were settling their differences with open conflict. In areas of Syria, the Jews were revolting and lynching Christians. Even in Constantinople, the crowds taunted Phocas for his love of liquor, implying alcoholism.

In 610, the Persian general, Shahrbaraz, was approaching Antioch, but the rebels of Africa posed a more immediate threat than the Persian front. Having secured control of Egypt, they proceeded to invade Syria and Cyprus while a large fleet under Heraclius the Younger set sail for Constantinople. Supporters from Sicily, Crete, and Thessalonica, were joining his campaign. The rebels reached Constantinople in October 610. The only forces available to Phocas to defend the city were the Excubitors of his bodyguard and the irregular forces of the Blues and Greens, the city's racing factions. Priscus, the commander of the Excubitors, chose the moment to reveal his allegiance to Heraclius the Younger. The Greens also changed sides in support of Heraclius the Younger and Constantinople fell to the Heraclii with relative ease.

Heraclius the Younger ultimately became the new emperor and Phocas was executed, along with several of his kinsmen and loyalists. According to John of Nikiu, Heraclius the Elder rejoiced at the news of his son rising to the throne, but died soon afterwards.

== Assessment ==
While Heraclius the Elder was a prominent general of his time, his military achievements were rather modest. The Byzantine historians covering his career were arguably attempting to magnify their importance to give Heraclius the Younger an exalted ancestry.

Preceded by Phocas in 603, then lapsed	Roman consul 608 with Heraclius, against Phocas	Succeeded by Heraclius
