= Tomb of An Jia =

A tomb of an Inner Asian elite

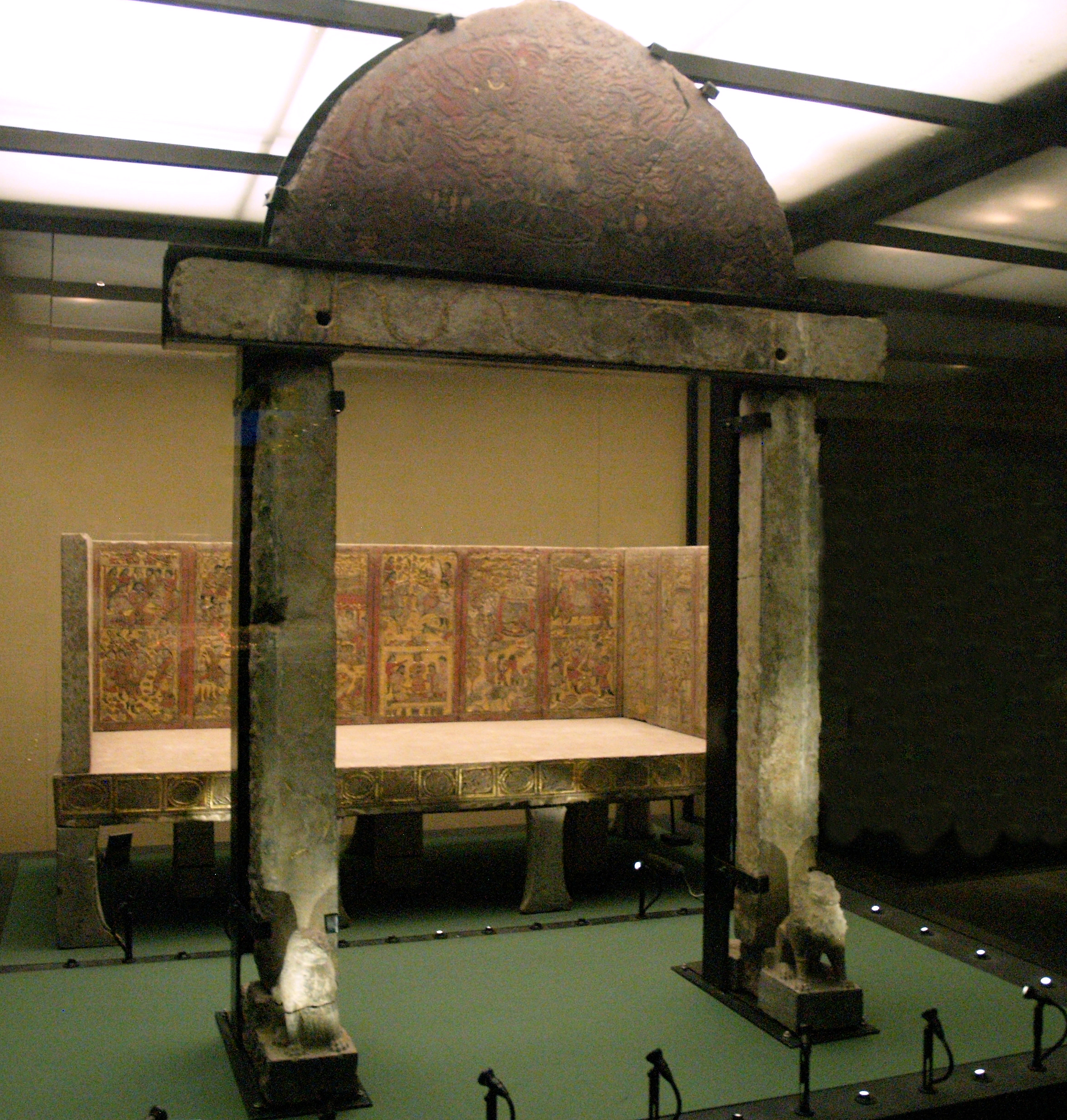
- Tomb of An Jia, Shaanxi Provincial Institute of Archaeology.
- Created: 579 CE
- Discovered: 34.306°N 108.952°E

Location

The Tomb of Ān Jiā, also sometimes read Ān Qié (Chinese: 安伽墓石門暨圍屏石榻; lit. 'Stone tomb gate and couch of An Jia'), is a Northern Zhou period (557–581 CE) funeral monument to a Sogdian nobleman named "An Jia" in the Chinese epitaph. The tomb was excavated in the city of Xi'an, then capital of Northern Zhou. It is now located in the collections of the Shaanxi Provincial Institute of Archaeology. An Jia (安伽) died in the founding year of the Daxiang (大象) era (579 CE), during the reign of Emperor Jing.

== The tomb ==
The tomb was composed of a stone gate and a stone couch located at the bottom of a ramped passageway 8.1 meters long, a structure which is typical of tombs built for Chinese nobility. It measured 3.66 meters square in size and 3.3 meters tall. The stone gate is decorated by two lions and an horizontal tablet where a Zoroastrian sacrificial scene is depicted. This stone couch is composed of 12 stone blocks, decorated with a total of 56 pictures. These pictures are not Chinese in style, and show vivid scenes from the life of An Jia: out-going, feast, hunting, and entertainment. Defying Chinese custom, An Jia's bones were found disarticulated and without anatomical order on the floor of the tomb rather than resting on top of the stone couch; some scholars have suggested that this is evidence of a secondary burial. Most of the structures and objects within the tomb, save for the stone couch, were found covered in a layer of soot. It can be concluded that this soot is the result of a fire occurring within the tomb, though the origin and date of the fire continues to be debated. One prominent theory for the cause of the fire suggests that it was the result of a Xianbei tradition that involved the burning of a deceased person’s belongings.

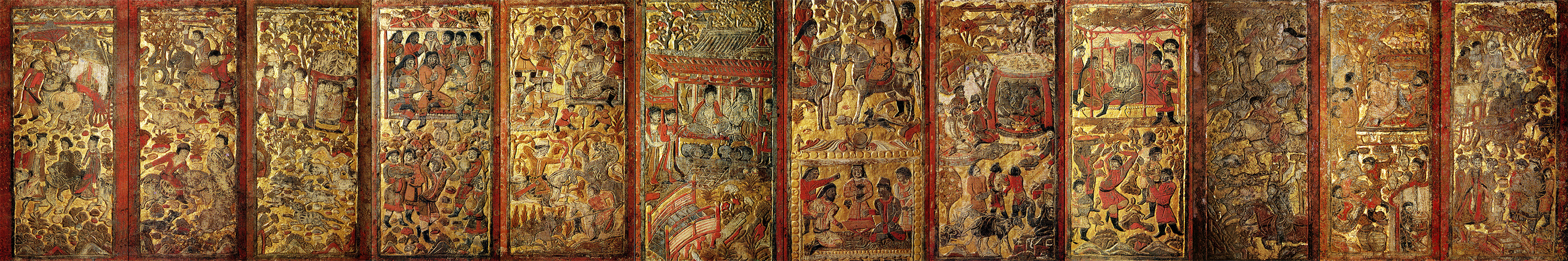
Figures on the Tomb of Anjia (back panels)

The tomb was undisturbed, the only Sogdian tomb to be found in such a state. It was excavated intact in 2001 and was designated as one of the top ten archeological discoveries of that year. Other famous Chinese Sogdian tombs of the contemporary period are the Tomb of Yu Hong and the Tomb of Wirkak. The tombs of An Jia, Wirkak, and Kang Ye were all found in the same area, indicating that this graveyard was reserved for foreigners.

== The Sogdian An Jia (518–579 CE) ==
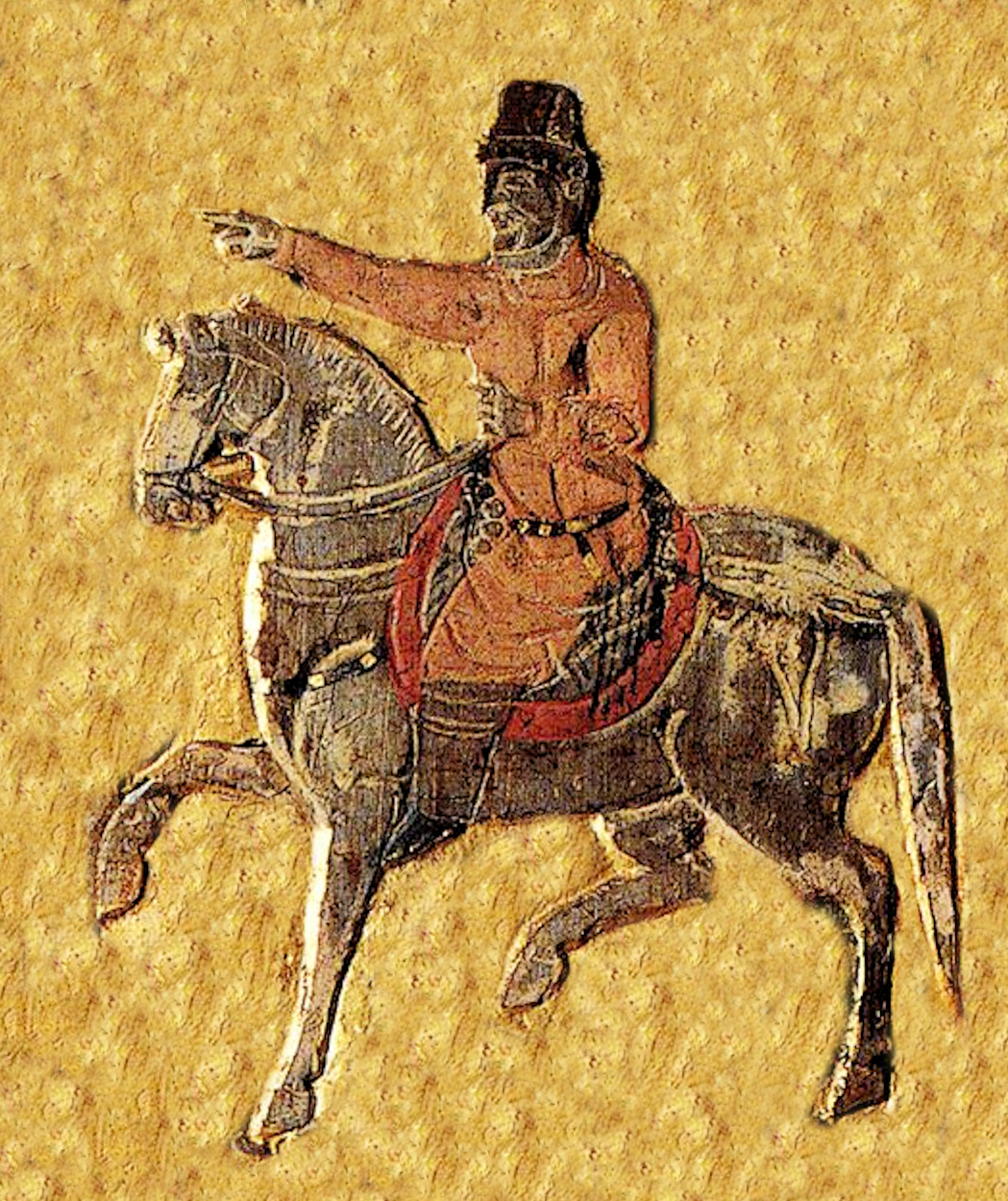
The Sogdian An Jia on his horse, as he appears in one of the panels. 579 CE

An Jia (518–579 CE, died at the age of 62) was from a Sogdian noble family from Bukhara. According to his epitaph, he was the son of An Tujian (安突建), a governor of Mei Prefecture in Sichuan, and Lady Du (杜氏) of Changsong (a former county in Wuwei, Gansu). He was in charge of commercial affairs for foreign merchants from Middle Asia doing businesses in China, as well as Zoroastrian affairs, for the Tong Prefecture of the Northern Zhou dynasty. He held the official Chinese title "Sàbǎo" (薩保, "Protector, Guardian", derived from the Sogdian word sārtpāw, "caravan leader"), used for government-appointed leaders of the Sogdian immigrant-merchant community. An Jia was based in Xi'an, and was buried there.

Sogdian tombs in China are among the most lavish of the period in this country, and are only slightly less lavish than Imperial tombs, suggesting that the Sogdian Sabao were among the wealthiest members of the population.

== Ethnographical aspects ==
The depictions in the tomb show the omnipresence of the Turks (at the time of the First Turkic Khaganate), who were probably the main trading partners of the Sogdian An Jia. The Hephthalites are essentially absent, or possibly showed once as a vassal ruler outside of the yurt of the Turk Qaghan, as they probably had been replaced by Turk hegemony by that time (they were destroyed by the alliance of the Sasanians and the Turks between 556 and 560 CE). In contrast, the Hephthalites are omnipresent in the Tomb of Wirkak, who, although he died at the same time of An Jia was much older at 85: Wirkak may therefore have primarily dealt with the Hephthalites during his younger years.

== Epitaph ==
The epitaph of An Jia is as follows:

Text in Chinese

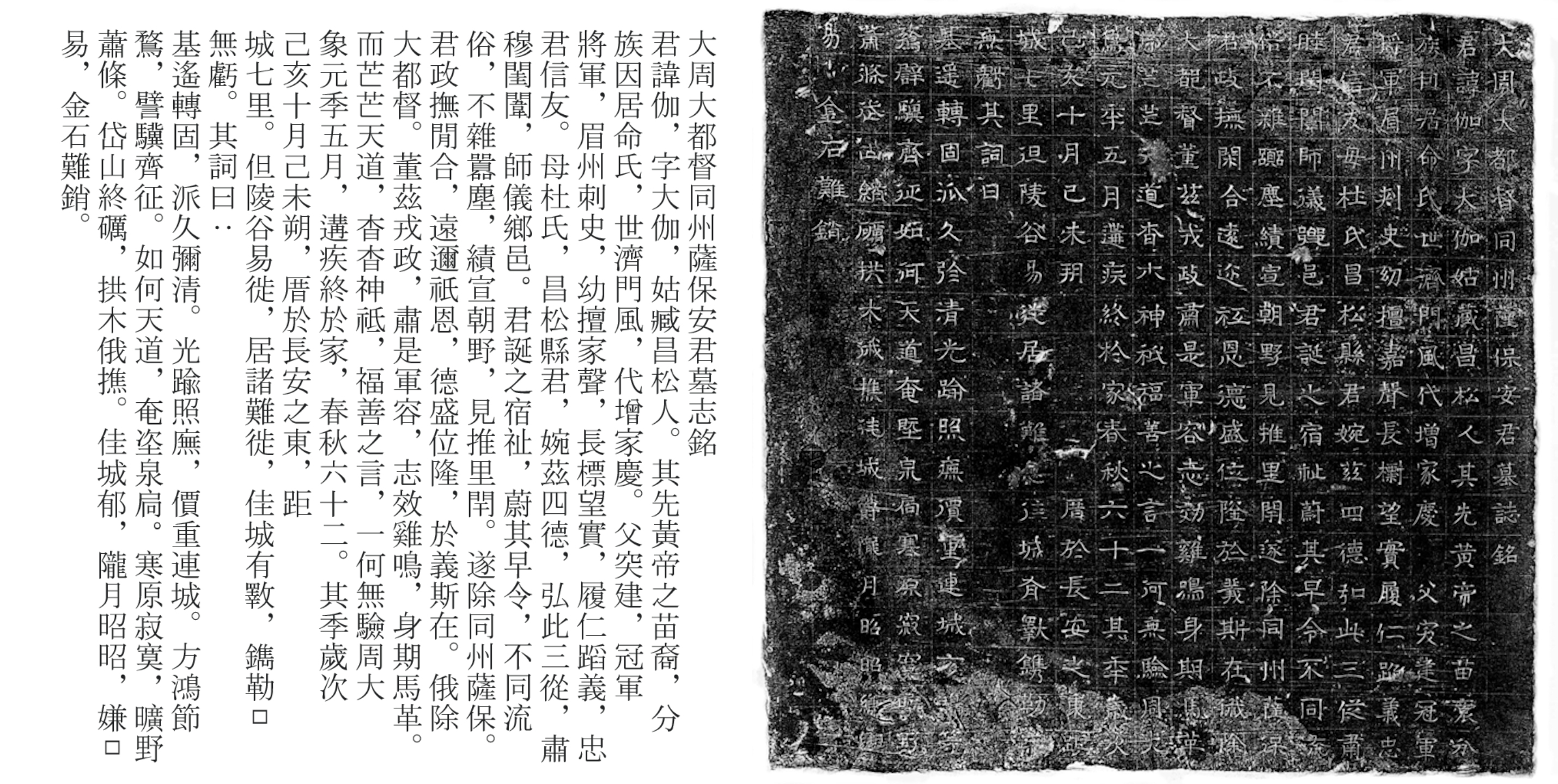

大周大都督同州薩保安君墓誌銘／君諱伽，字大伽，姑臧昌松人。其先黃帝之苗裔，分／族因居命氏，世濟門風，代增家慶。父突建，冠軍／將軍，眉州㓨史，幼擅家聲，長標望實，履仁蹈義，忠／君信友。母杜氏，昌松縣君，婉茲四德，弘此三從，粛／穆閨闈，師儀鄉邑。君誕之宿祉，蔚其早令，不同流／俗，不雜嚻塵，績宣朝野，見推里閈。遂除同州薩保。 ／君政撫閑合，遠迩祇恩，德盛位隆，於義斯在。俄除／大都督。董茲戎政，粛是軍容，志效雞鳴，身期馬革。 ／而芒芒天道，杳杳神祗，福善之言，一何無驗周大／像元年五月，遘疾終於家，春秋六十二。其秊嵗次／己亥十月己未朔，厝於長安之東，距／城七里。但陵谷易徙，居諸難徙，佳城有斁，鎸勒□／無虧。其詞曰：／基遥轉固，泒久弥清。光踰照廡，價重連城。方鴻節／鶩，譬驥齊征。如何天道，奄塈泉扃。寒原寂寞，曠野／䔥條。岱山終礪，拱木俄撨。佳城欝，隴月昭昭，嫌□／易，金石難銷。

"Epitaph of An, Sabao and Grand Governor of Tong Prefecture. His first name was Jia, also called "Dajia", and came from Guzangchangsong..."

— Epitaph of An Jia (translation upcoming)

== Tomb decorations ==
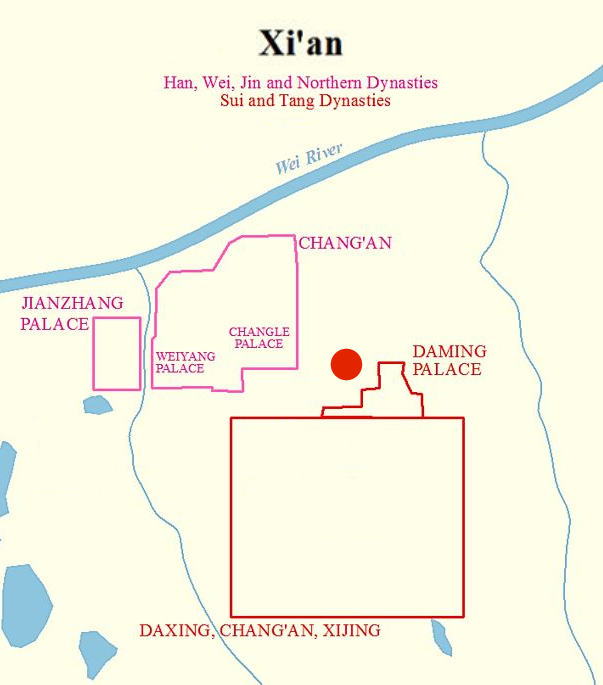
Original location of the tomb of Anjia (red dot) in Xi'an.

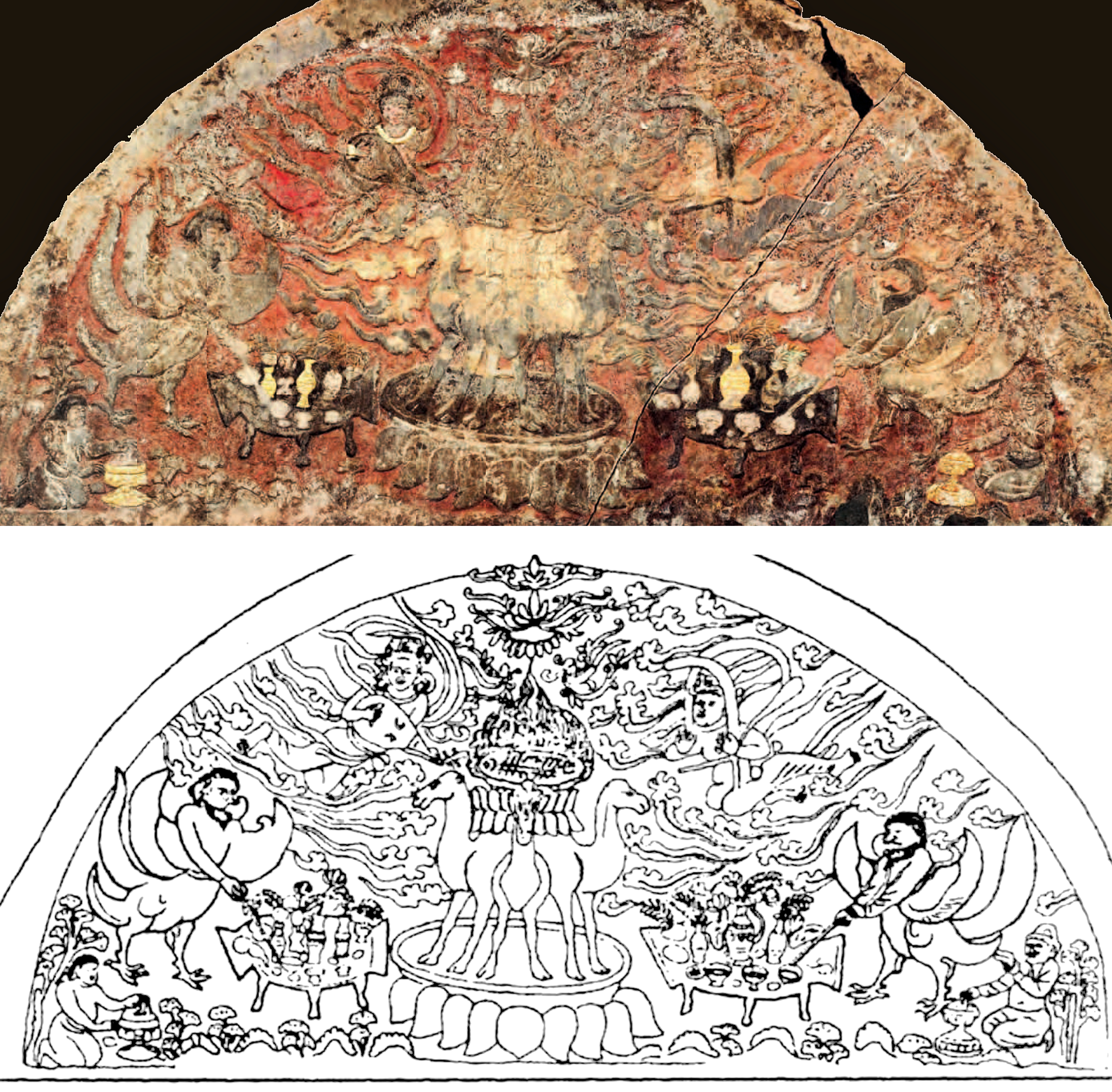
A Zoroastrian fire worship ceremony, depicted on the gable of the gate of the tomb.

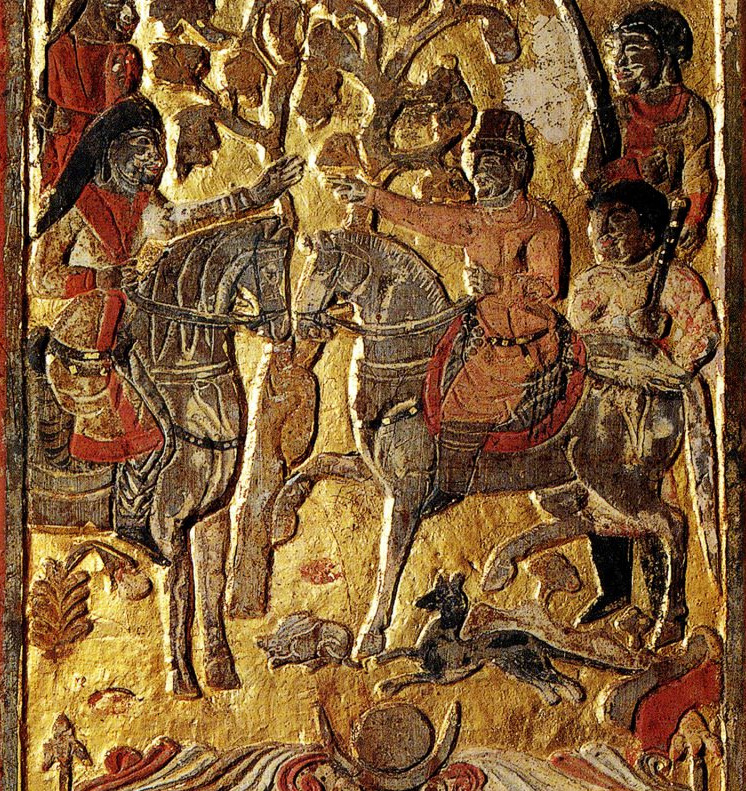
Anjia (right) welcomes a Turkic leader (left, long hair combed in the back).

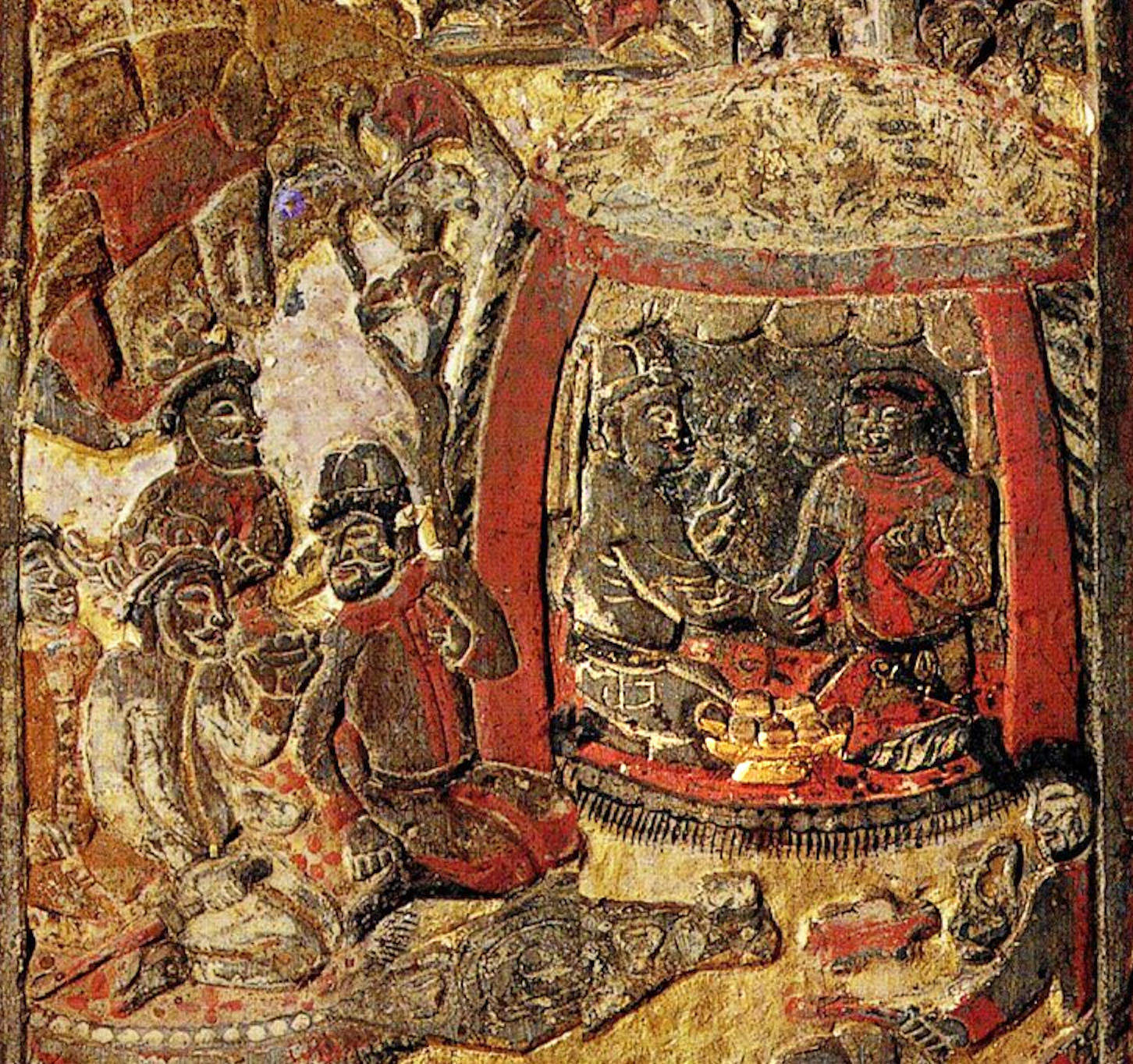
The Sogdian merchant An Jia with a Turkic Chieftain in his yurt.

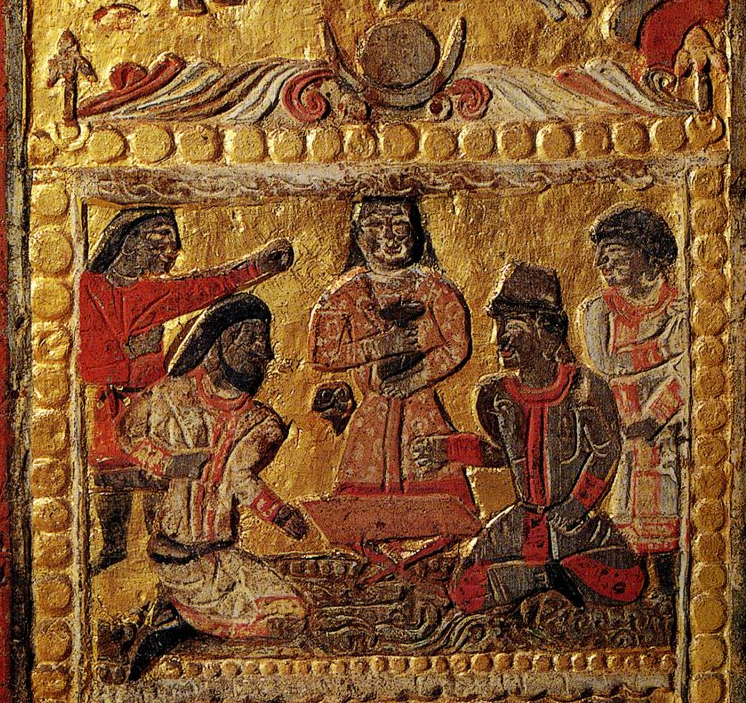
An Jia (right) brokering an alliance with Turks (left).

== See also ==
- Tomb of Li Dan
