= Mahbod (envoy) =

Mahbod (also known as Mebodes), was a 6th-century Iranian ambassador and military officer from the House of Suren, who was active during the reign of the Sasanian shahanshahs Khosrow I (r. 531–579) and Hormizd IV (r. 579–590).

== Biography ==
Map of the Byzantine-Sasanian frontier in Late Antiquity.

A member of the House of Suren, he was perhaps the son or grandson of his namesake Mahbod, who was active under the shahanshahs Kavad I (r. 488–496, 498/9–531) and Khosrow I (r. 531–579). He is first mentioned in late 567, when he was sent as an envoy to the Byzantine capital of Constantinople to reach an agreement over the Lazican region of Suania. Although emperor Justin II (r. 565–574) accepted a letter addressed to him by Khosrow I, he ignored Mahbod and refused to grant him an audience. Mahbod then attempted to reach out to Justinian through an envoy of Lakhmids who had accompanied him, but to no avail. After an Iranian proposal of a five-year truce was rejected by emperor Tiberius II Constantine (r. 578–582) in 574/575, Mahbod sent Tamkhosrow to raid the surroundings of the fortress of Dara. However, the Romans soon proposed a three-year truce in exchange for 30,000 gold, which Mahbod accepted.

In 576, when Mahbod held the title of Sar-nakhveraghan ("chief of the governors"), he was sent by Khosrow I to negotiate peace with the Byzantine emissaries Theodorus, Ioannes, Petrus and Zacharias. The meeting took place in Athraelon, on the outskirts of Dara, and negotiations dragged on until 577, due to both parties blaming each other for start of the war. Mahbod proposal for peace in exchange for annual payments was rejected by the Romans, and thus hostilities resumed. In June 578, Khosrow I appointed Mahbod the head of an Iranian expedition in Mesopotamia: the force, which consisted of 12,000 Iranians and 8,000 Arabs, ravaged the areas around Resaina and Constantia. At the same time, Mahbod sent Tamkhosrow to attack the surroundings of Martyropolis and Amida.

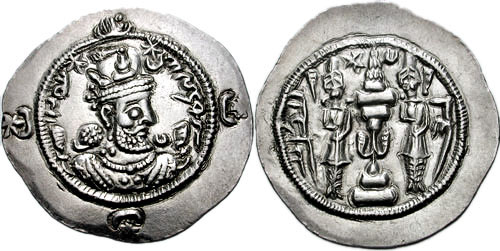
Coin of Hormizd IV (r. 579–590)

In 579, the newly ascended shahanshah Hormizd IV (r. 579–590) sent Mahbod to interrogate and dismiss the Byzantine emissaries Zacharias and Theodorus from the Iranian court. In the spring of 586, Mahbod was a provincial governor, perhaps of a frontier province. He was sent to negotiate with the Byzantine commander Philippicus at Amida. Negotiations, however, broke down after Mahbod's demand for gold in exchange for peace was rejected. Not long after, an Iranian force—led by Kardarigan, Aphraates and Mahbod—suffered a heavy defeat against the Byzantines at the Battle of Solachon.

In the spring/summer of 589, Hormizd IV sent Mahbod to attack Philippicus, who was outside Martyropolis. Another force under Aphraates was also dispatched, due to Mahbod's forces proving insufficient. Although the Iranians won the battle, Mahbod was killed by a Byzantine projectile.

== Sources ==
- Bonner, Michael (2020). The Last Empire of Iran. New York: Gorgias Press. pp. 1–406. ISBN 978-1463206161.
- Greatrex, Geoffrey; Lieu, Samuel N. C., eds. (2002). "Justinian's First Persian War and the Eternal Peace". The Roman Eastern Frontier and the Persian Wars (Part II, 363–630 AD). New York, New York and London, United Kingdom: Routledge. pp. 82–97. ISBN 0-415-14687-9.
- Martindale, John R., ed. (1992). The Prosopography of the Later Roman Empire: Volume III, AD 527–641. Cambridge: Cambridge University Press. ISBN 0-521-20160-8.
- Warren, Soward. Theophylact Simocatta and the Persians. Sasanika.
- Whitby, Michael; Whitby, Mary, eds. (1986). The History of Theophylact Simocatta. Oxford, United Kingdom: Clarendon Press. ISBN 978-0-19-822799-1.
