= Kardarigan (7th century) =

Military general

Kardarigan (Greek: Καρδαριγάν) was a Sassanid Persian general of the early 7th century, who fought in the Byzantine–Sasanian War of 602–628. He is usually distinguished from another Persian general of the same name who was active during the 580s. The name is actually an honorific title and means "black hawk".

== Biography ==
When the Persian shah Khosrau II (r. 590–628) declared war against the Byzantine usurper Phocas (r. 602–610), he sent Kardarigan along with Shahrbaraz against Byzantine positions in Armenia and Anatolia (circa 607/608). According to a Syriac source, echoed in the Chronicle of Theophanes the Confessor, Kardarigan's forces are said to have seized many cities, conquered Armenia, and marched through Cappadocia, Galatia, and Paphlagonia reaching Chalcedon, across from the Byzantine capital of Constantinople in 608 or 609. This information, however, is considered inaccurate by modern scholars.

Kardarigan re-appears in 626 as the second-in-command of the Persian army under Shahrbaraz, sent to take part in the joint siege of Constantinople with the Avars. The destruction by the Byzantines of the fleet of the Avars' Slavic subjects forced the Persians into a passive role in the siege, which was repulsed. At this juncture, Khosrau sent a letter to him, ordering him to kill Shahrbaraz, assume command of the army, and return it to Persia. The letter was intercepted by the Byzantines, who altered it to show that Khosrau had ordered the execution of no less than 400 of the army's officers. This provoked a revolt against Khosrau, and Shahrbaraz and his army concluded an alliance with the Byzantine emperor Heraclius (r. 610–641).

Kardarigan loyally supported Shahrbaraz thereafter against Khosrau. In 629, however, after Khosrau's overthrow, Shahrbaraz killed the legitimate shah, the boy ruler Ardashir III (r. 628–629) and assumed the throne himself. Kardarigan opposed his erstwhile commander, but was defeated and killed.

== Sources ==
- Greatrex, Geoffrey; Lieu, Samuel N. C. (2002). The Roman Eastern Frontier and the Persian Wars (Part II, 363–630 AD). New York, New York and London, United Kingdom: Routledge (Taylor & Francis). ISBN 0-415-14687-9.
- Haldon, John (2001). The Byzantine Wars: Battles and Campaigns of the Byzantine Era. Stroud, Gloucestershire: Tempus. ISBN 0-7524-1795-9.
- Martindale, John R., ed. (1992). The Prosopography of the Later Roman Empire: Volume III, AD 527–641. Cambridge: Cambridge University Press. ISBN 0-521-20160-8.
