= House of Suren =

Iranian noble family

- Country: Sakastan
- Current head: None, extinct
- Members: Surena, Gregory the Illuminator, Chihor-Vishnasp, Mehr Narseh, Mahbod
- Estate: Sakastan
- Cadet branches: Gondopharids

House of Suren or Surenas (Parthian: 𐭎𐭅𐭓𐭉𐭍 Surēn, Middle Persian: 𐭮𐭥𐭫𐭩𐭭) is one of two^{[c]} Parthian noble families explicitly mentioned by name in sources dateable to the Arsacid period. They held considerable influence within the Parthian Empire and were the rulers of Sistan.

== History ==
The head of Suren family had the privilege to crown the first Parthian king in the 3rd century BC, which founded a tradition that was continued by his descendants.^{[a]} Following the 3rd century AD defeat of the Arsacids and the subsequent rise of the Sassanids, the Surenas then switched sides and began to serve the Sassanids, at whose court they were identified as one of the so-called "Parthian clans." The last attested scion of the family was a military commander active in northern China during the 9th century.

It is probable that the Surenas were landowners in Sakastan, that is, in the region between Arachosia and Drangiana in present-day southeast Iran and Southern Afghanistan. The Surenas appear to have governed Sistan (which derives its name from 'Sakastan' and was once a much larger region than the present day province) as their personal fiefdom.

Notable members of the family include the 1st century BC cavalry commander Surena, Gregory the Illuminator, and Chihor-Vishnasp, a 6th-century AD governor of Armenia who attempted to establish Zoroastrianism in that country.

Mehr Narseh, the minister of four Sasanian kings, was from the House of Suren, as was Mahbod, who was ambassador during the reigns of Khosrow I (r. 531–579) and Hormizd IV (r. 579–590).

=== Gondopharids ===
The ruling dynasty of the Indo-Parthian kingdom may have belonged to the house of Suren. "Ernst Herzfeld maintained that the dynasty of [the Indo-Parthian emperor] Gondophares represented the House of Suren."

== Bibliography ==
- Bivar, A. D. H. (1983), "The Political History of Iran under the Arsacids", in Yarshater, Ehsan (ed.), Cambridge History of Iran, vol. 3, London: Cambridge UP, pp. 21–100
- Bivar, A. D. H. (2003), "Gondophares", Encyclopaedia Iranica, vol. 11, Costa Mesa: Mazda, archived from the original on 2008-09-08
- Frye, R. N. (1983), "The Political History of Iran under the Sassanians", in Yarshater, Ehsan (ed.), Cambridge History of Iran, vol. 3, London: Cambridge UP, pp. 116–181
- Gazerani, Saghi (2015). The Sistani Cycle of Epics and Iran's National History: On the Margins of Historiography. BRILL. pp. 1–250. ISBN 9789004282964.
- Herzfeld, Ernst Emil, ed. (1929), "Das Haus Sūrēn von Sakastan-->", Archæologische Mitteilungen aus Iran, vol. I, Berlin: Dietrich Reimer, pp. 70–80
- Justi, Ferdinand (1895), "Sūrēn", Iranisches Namenbuch, Leipzig/Marburg: Elwert, pp. 316–317.
- Lang, David M. (1983), "Iran, Armenia and Georgia", in Yarshater, Ehsan (ed.), Cambridge History of Iran, vol. 3, London: Cambridge UP, pp. 505–537
- Lendering, Jona (2006), Surena, Amsterdam: livius.org, archived from the original on 2012-10-12
- Lukonin, V. G. (1983), "Political, Social and Administrative Institutions", in Yarshater, Ehsan (ed.), Cambridge History of Iran, vol. 3, London: Cambridge UP, pp. 681–747
- Martindale, John R., ed. (1992). The Prosopography of the Later Roman Empire: Volume III, AD 527–641. Cambridge: Cambridge University Press. ISBN 0-521-20160-8.
- Plutarch, "Marcus Crassus", in Langhorne, John; Langhorne, William, eds. (1934), Plutarch's Lives, London: J. Crissy
- Pourshariati, Parvaneh (2008). Decline and Fall of the Sasanian Empire: The Sasanian-Parthian Confederacy and the Arab Conquest of Iran. London and New York: I.B. Tauris. ISBN 978-1-84511-645-3.
- Rawlinson, George (1901), The Seven Great Monarchies Of The Ancient Eastern World, vol. 6, London: Dodd, Mead & Company
- Perikanian, A. (1983), "Iranian Society and Law", in Yarshater, Ehsan (ed.), Cambridge History of Iran, vol. 3, London: Cambridge UP, pp. 627–681
- Schippmann, K. (1987), "Arsacid ii: The Arsacid Dynasty", Encyclopaedia Iranica, vol. 2, New York: Routledge & Kegan Paul, pp. 525–536, archived from the original on 2009-12-19
