= Tong Prefecture (Shaanxi) =

Historical administrative division in Shaanxi, China

Tongzhou or Tong Prefecture (Chinese: t 衕州, s 同州, p Tòngzhōu) was a prefecture of imperial China seated in modern Dali County, Shaanxi. It existed intermittently from AD 554 to 1913.

Between 1735 and 1913 during the Qing dynasty it was known as Tongzhou Prefecture (t 衕州府, s 同州府, p Tòngzhōufǔ).

== Geography ==
The administrative region of Tongzhou in the Tang dynasty is under the administration of modern Weinan in eastern Shaanxi:

- Dali County
- Hancheng City
- Heyang County
- Chengcheng County
- Baishui County
