= Aphumon =

Historical Armenian fortress

Aphumon, also Aphum or Aphoum, was a Sasanian city fortress and the main fortification in the district of Arzanene in Armenia. It functioned as a frontier stronghold and was the site of various battles during the Roman-Persian wars.
