= Shaanxi Provincial Institute of Archaeology =

- 陕西省考古研究院
- Location in of the museum
- Established: 1958
- Location: Yanta District, Xi'an, Shaanxi, China
- Coordinates: 34.231912°N 108.972049°E
- Type: Provincial museum
- Key holdings: Cultural relics from Shaanxi
- Collections: 140,000
- President: Sun Zhouyong (孙周勇)
- Website: www.shxkgy.cn/index.htm

Shaanxi Provincial Institute of Archaeology
- Traditional Chinese: 陝西省考古研究院
- Simplified Chinese: 陕西省考古研究院
Transcriptions
Standard Mandarin
- Hanyu Pinyin: Shǎnxīshěng Kǎogǔ Yánjiūyuàn

Shaanxi Provincial Institute of Archaeology (Chinese: 陕西省考古研究院) is the official archaeological institute of China's Shaanxi Province. It operates an archaeological museum in Yanta District of Xi'an with a collection of more than 140,000 objects including bronzes, statues, pottery, porcelain, and books. There are nearly 130 thousand books in the library of the institute, making it one of the largest collections of books in the field of literature and archaeology in China.

== History ==
Shaanxi Provincial Institute of Archaeology was founded in September 1958 with the name of "Institute of archaeology, Shaanxi branch of Chinese Academy of Sciences".

In 1963, the institute was under the jurisdiction of Shaanxi Provincial Academy of Social Sciences and was renamed "Shaanxi Provincial Institute of Archaeology" later.

In January 1970, Shaanxi Provincial Institute of Archaeology, former Shaanxi Museum and Shaanxi Cultural Relics Management Committee merged into the Shaanxi Museum.

In October 1978, after the Cultural Revolution, The General Office of the CPC Shaanxi Provincial Committee approved the restoration of the Shaanxi Provincial Institute of Archaeology. The institute is under the jurisdiction of Shaanxi Cultural Relics Bureau since 1984.

== List of presidents ==
No.	English name	Chinese name	Took office	Left office	Notes
1	Wu Bolun	武伯纶	September 1958	May 1968	
2	Wang Xiu	王修	May 1968	January 1970	
3	Wang Xiu	王修	October 1978	December 1979	
4	Li Shengting/ Liu Shurong	李圣庭/刘树荣	December 1979	August 1984	Deputy Presidents
5	Shi Xingbang	石兴邦	August 1984	June 1989	
6	Gong Qiming	巩启明	June 1989	September 1994	
7	Han Wei	韩伟	September 1994	April 2001	
8	Jiao Nanfeng	焦南峰	April 2001	December 2007	
9	Wang Weilin	王炜林	December 2007	2013	
10	Sun Zhouyong	孙周勇	2013		
