= Kardarigan (6th century) =

Persian military leader

Kardarigan (Greek: Καρδαριγάν) was a Sassanid Persian general of the late 6th century AD, who fought in the Byzantine–Persian War of 572–591. Since he is recorded as being old enough to have an adult nephew in 586, it is uncertain whether he is the same as the general of the same name who fought in the later wars of the early 7th century. His name is actually an honorific title and means "black hawk".

== Biography ==
Kardarigan first appears as commander of the Persian forces in northern Mesopotamia in late 582, when he opposed a Byzantine siege of the fort Acbas in Arzanene under John Mystacon and defeated him at a battle at the river Nymphius. In the campaign of 583, he laid siege to the fort of Aphumon, but abandoned the siege to help repel a Byzantine attack on the newly constructed fort of Akbas. In autumn 584, as he was preparing an incursion into Byzantine territory, he was forced to turn east to counter a Byzantine invasion under Philippicus. Philippicus withdrew before Kardarigan, abandoning his campaign. In 585, while Philippicus had fallen ill, Kardarigan went on the offensive, besieging the Byzantine base of Monocarton. The siege failed, and he then marched north to Martyropolis, Philippicus's base; after sacking a monastery near the city, however, he returned to Persian territory.

In summer 586, Kardarigan attacked the army of Philippicus at Solachon, commanding the central division of the Persian army in person. The battle ended in a heavy defeat, and although Kardarigan himself escaped, the survivors of his army suffered greatly because of his decision to destroy his army's water supplies before the battle, in an attempt to harden his men's resolve. Nevertheless, while Philippicus proceeded to attack the fortress of Chlomaron, Kardarigan managed to assemble an improvised force, mostly composed of peasant levies. He then marched to Chlomaron and united his army with its defenders, forcing the Byzantine general to raise the siege. He is not heard of thereafter, until another (or possibly the same) general of that name appears in circa 605.

== Sources ==
- Greatrex, Geoffrey; Lieu, Samuel N. C. (2002). The Roman Eastern Frontier and the Persian Wars (Part II, 363–630 AD). New York, New York and London, United Kingdom: Routledge (Taylor & Francis). ISBN 0-415-14687-9.
- Haldon, John (2001). The Byzantine Wars: Battles and Campaigns of the Byzantine Era. Stroud, Gloucestershire: Tempus. ISBN 0-7524-1795-9.
- Martindale, John R., ed. (1992). The Prosopography of the Later Roman Empire: Volume III, AD 527–641. Cambridge: Cambridge University Press. ISBN 0-521-20160-8.
