= Philippicus (comes excubitorum) =

Byzantine military officer

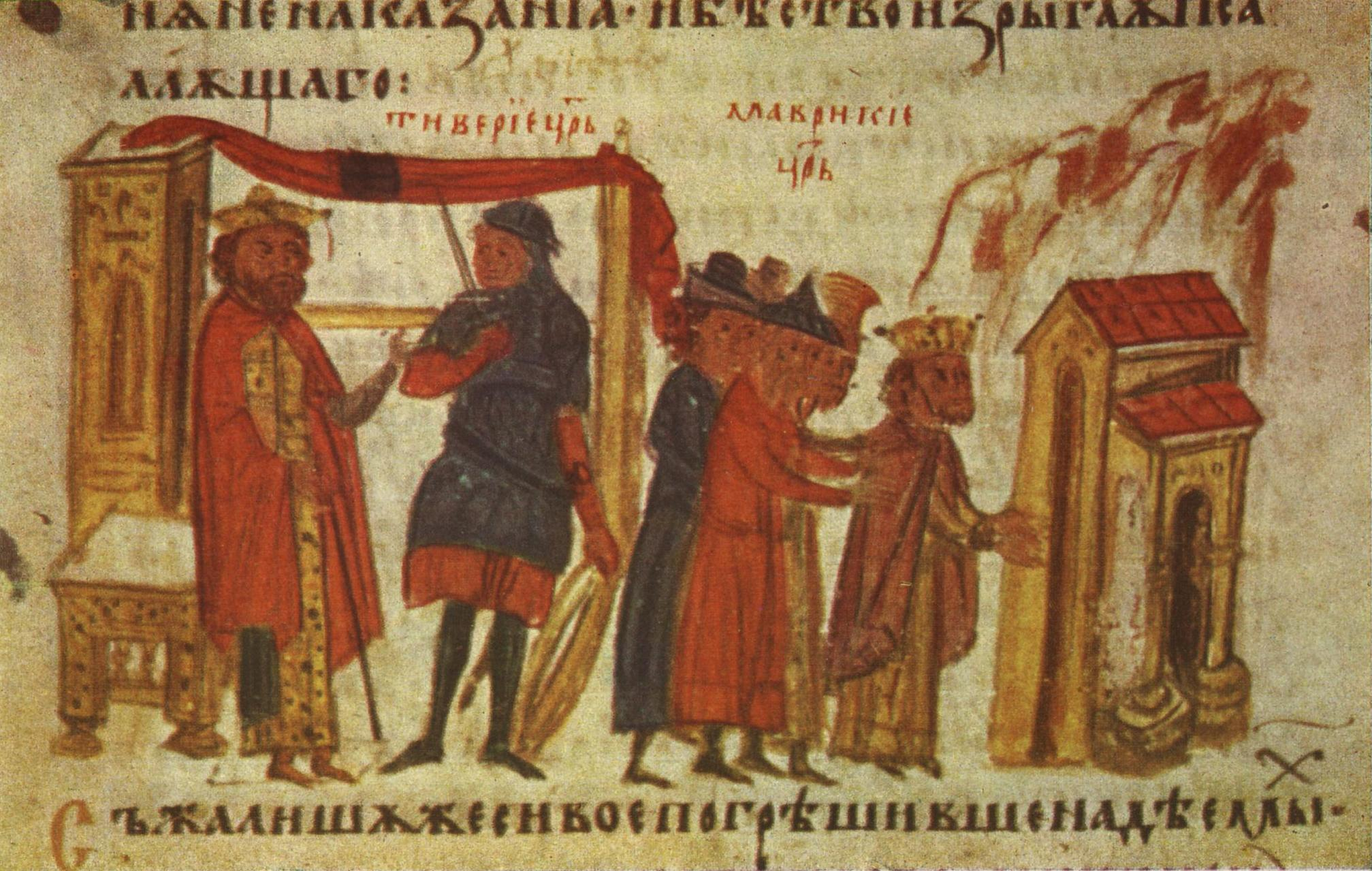
- Exile of Philippicus (right). Miniature from the 12th century Manasses Chronicle.
- Relatives: Emperor Maurice and Peter (brothers-in-law)
- Military career
- Allegiance: East Roman Empire
- Rank: magister militum per Orientem, comes excubitorum
- Conflicts: Byzantine–Sassanid War of 572–591, Maurice's Balkan campaigns, Byzantine–Sassanid War of 602–628

Philippicus (Greek: Φιλιππικός; fl. 580s–610s) was an Eastern Roman general, comes excubitorum, and brother-in-law of Emperor Maurice (r. 582–602). His successful career as a general spanned three decades, chiefly against the Sassanid Persians.

== Career under Maurice ==
Map of the Roman-Persian frontier.

Little is known about Philippicus's early years. He was married to Gordia, sister of Emperor Maurice (reigned 582–602), probably in 583, and was at some point raised to the high rank of patricius. At about the same time, he was appointed comes excubitorum (Commander of the Excubitors, the imperial bodyguard), and in 584, he replaced John Mystacon as magister militum for the East, thus becoming responsible for the conduct of the ongoing war against the Sassanid Persians.

He commanded numerous raids into Persian territory in 584–585, ravaging the plains near Nisibis, and making inroads in the regions of Arzanene and eastern Mesopotamia. During the same period, he actively tried to improve the discipline and efficiency of his troops.

Philippicus spent the winter of 585–586 in Constantinople, and returned to his headquarters in Amida in the spring. After Persian peace proposals were rejected, he advanced his troops to the frontier, where he defeated a superior Persian force under Kardarigan at the Battle of Solachon. He then proceeded to invade and plunder Arzanene and laid siege to the fortress of Chlomaron. However, the approach of a Persian relief army panicked the Romans, who fled in disorder back into Roman territory. There, possibly due to illness, he handed over command of his army to his hypostrategos (lieutenant general) Heraclius, the father of the future emperor Heraclius (r. 610–641). In spring 587, he was again ill, and unable to campaign in person. He assigned two thirds of his army to Heraclius and the remainder to generals Theodore and Andreas, and sent them to raid Persian territory. He did not campaign himself that year, and in the winter, he set off towards Constantinople. On his way, he learned that he had been replaced by Priscus.

When Priscus arrived in the East, however, the soldiers refused to obey him, and elected the dux of Phoenice Libanensis, Germanus, as their leader in his stead. Philippicus, who was soon re-appointed as commander of the East, could only assume his command after the mutiny was quelled through the intervention of the Patriarch of Antioch. After a public reconciliation with his troops, in the summer of 589 he campaigned against the city of Martyropolis, which had recently fallen to the Persians through the treacherous defection of a Roman officer named Sittas. Philippicus failed to retake it and was defeated by a Persian relief force led by Mahbodh and Aphrarat, after which he was replaced by Comentiolus.

Except for a diplomatic mission in 590 to the recently deposed Persian ruler Khosrau II (r. 590–628), who had taken refuge in Roman territory, Philippicus disappears from the scene for several years. In 598, he was briefly appointed general in the ongoing war in the Balkans, and is credited by some sources with a victory over the Avars in Thrace, although this is most likely due to a confusion with general Priscus.

== Career under Phocas and Heraclius ==
At some point in 602, suspicions fell upon him of plotting against Emperor Maurice, since a prophecy stated that the name of Maurice's successor would begin with a Φ (Phi). Indeed, soon after, Maurice was deposed and killed by a revolt in the Balkan army led by Phocas. As a close associate of Maurice, Philippicus was tonsured and forced to enter a monastery in Chrysopolis. He was still at the monastery when Heraclius overthrew Phocas in 610. The new emperor recalled him and sent him to negotiate with Phocas's brother, Comentiolus, who commanded the eastern army. Comentiolus imprisoned him and intended to execute him, but Philippicus was saved when Comentiolus himself was murdered.

In 612, he was again appointed by Heraclius as magister militum per Orientem succeeding the disgraced Priscus, and campaigned against the Persians in Armenia. In 614, as a Persian army under Shahin invaded Asia Minor and reached the shores of the Bosporus at Chalcedon, Philippicus invaded Persian territory in turn, hoping to cause Shahin to withdraw.

Philippicus died shortly thereafter and was buried in a church he had built at Chrysopolis.

== Possible authorship of the Strategikon ==
As one of the leading generals of his day, and with both the time and opportunity to write it sometime after 603, during the years he spent in a monastery, Philippicus is one of the possible authors of the military treatise known as the Strategikon and traditionally attributed to Maurice.

== Sources ==
- Greatrex, Geoffrey; Lieu, Samuel N. C. (2002). The Roman Eastern Frontier and the Persian Wars (Part II, 363–630 AD). London: Routledge. ISBN 0-415-14687-9.
- Martindale, John R., ed. (1992). The Prosopography of the Later Roman Empire: Volume III, AD 527–641. Cambridge: Cambridge University Press. ISBN 0-521-20160-8.
- Whitby, Michael (1988). The Emperor Maurice and his Historian – Theophylact Simocatta on Persian and Balkan Warfare. Oxford: Oxford University Press. ISBN 0-19-822945-3.
