= Tomb of Kang Ye =

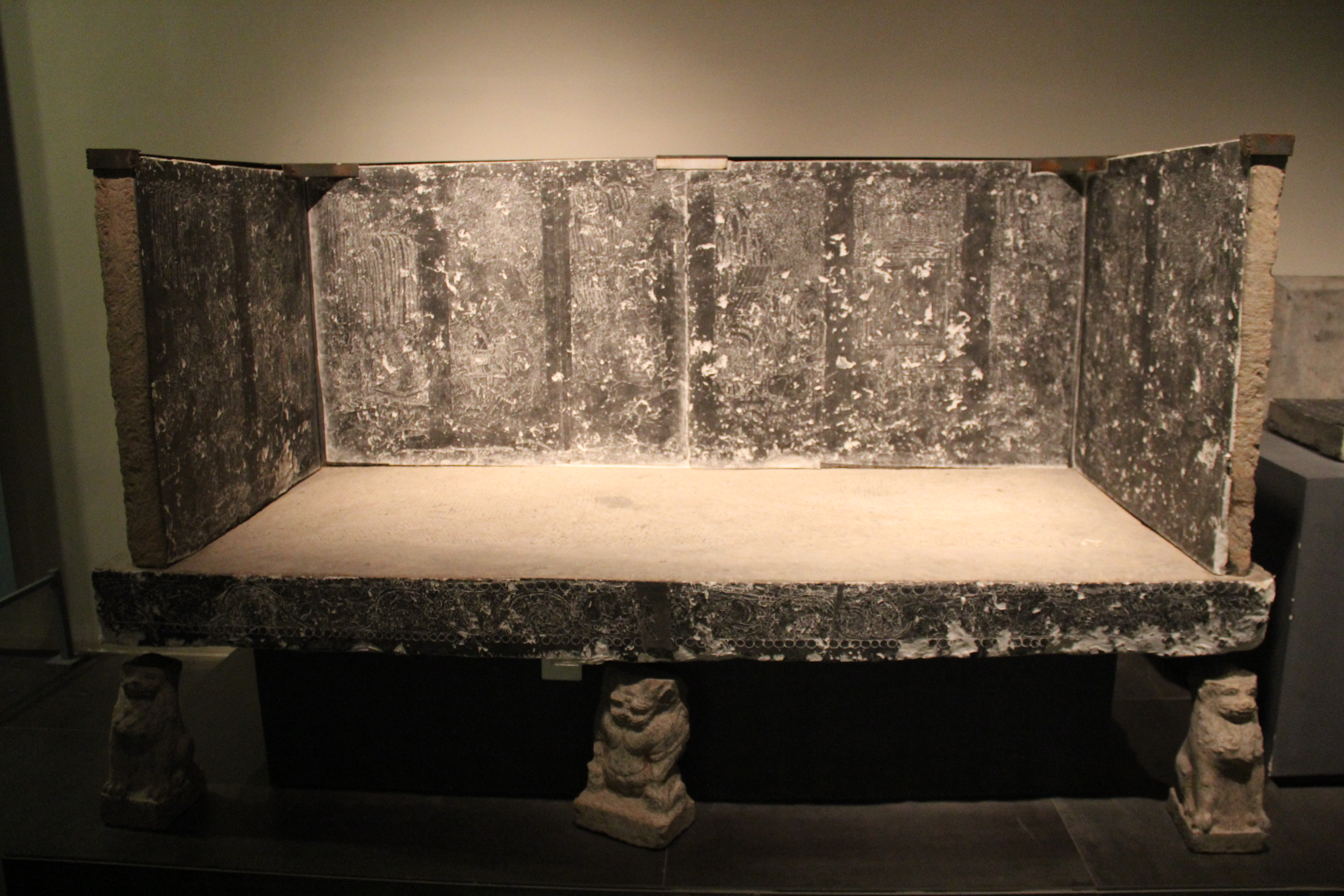
- Tomb of Kangye, 571 CE. Northern Zhou, China.
- Created: 571 CE
- Discovered: Northern China
- Present location: Xi'an City Museum

Location

The Tomb of Kang Ye (traditional Chinese: 康業墓; simplified Chinese: 康业墓; pinyin: Kāng Yè mù) is a Northern Zhou (Northern Dynasties 439-589 CE) period funeral monument to a Sogdian nobleman and official in northern China named Kang Ye in his epitaph. The tomb was discovered in the northern suburbs of Xi'an in 2004. It is now located in the collections of the Xi'an City Museum. It is dated to 571 CE, from the epitaph.

The stone couch is composed of stone slabs, decorated with reliefs showing the life of the deceased and scene of the afterlife. Contrary to the other known Sogdian funerary monuments, the decorations of the tomb do not have Zoroastrian elements, and they follow Chinese stylistics traditions, with the use of shallow engraved lines.

According to the epitaph, Kang Ye was a descendant of the king of Kangju (Sogdiana). His father was once an official in China with the title of "Grand Heavenly Master" (大天主) during the Wei dynasty, a title possibly related to a ministerial position in the Zoroastrian religion. Kang Ye then inherited the title of "Grand Heavenly Master" with the agreement of the Chinese emperor. Kang Ye died at the age of 60. His corpse was placed on top of the tomb and wrapped in a Chinese silk robe.

The tomb was probably decorated by Chinese engravers, as suggested by the somewhat grotesque features of some of the Sogdians individuals on the tomb panels (large noses, bulging eyes...).

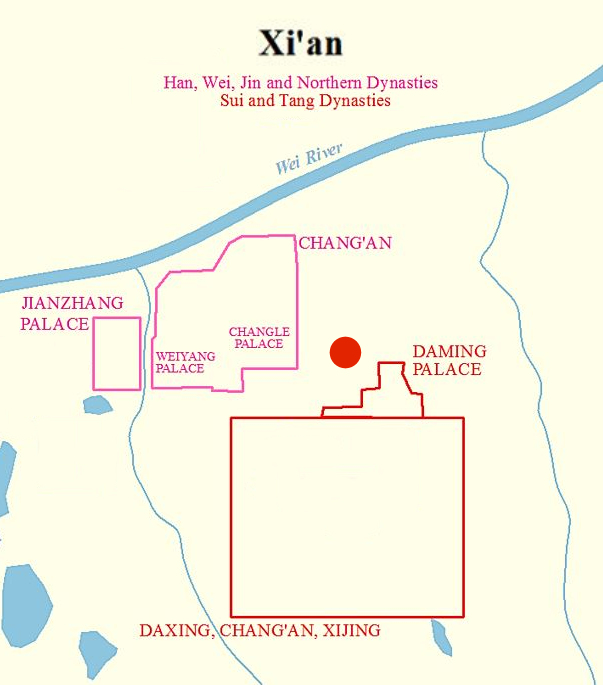
Original location of the tomb of Kangye (red dot), in Xi'an.

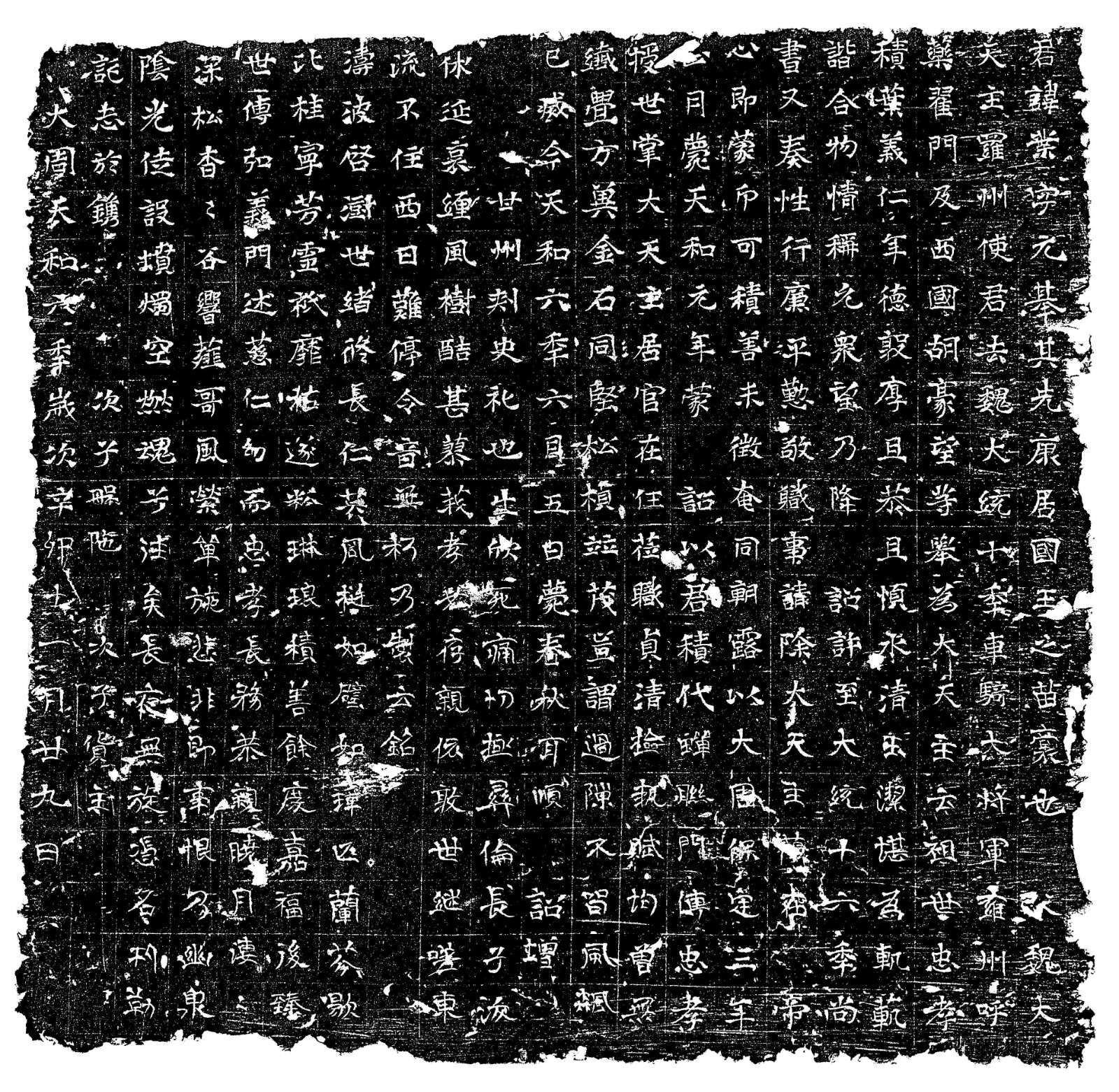
Epitaph

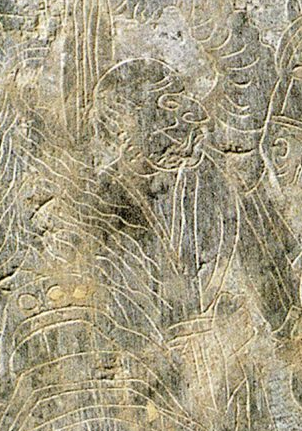
Tomb of Kang Ye, Sogdian groom

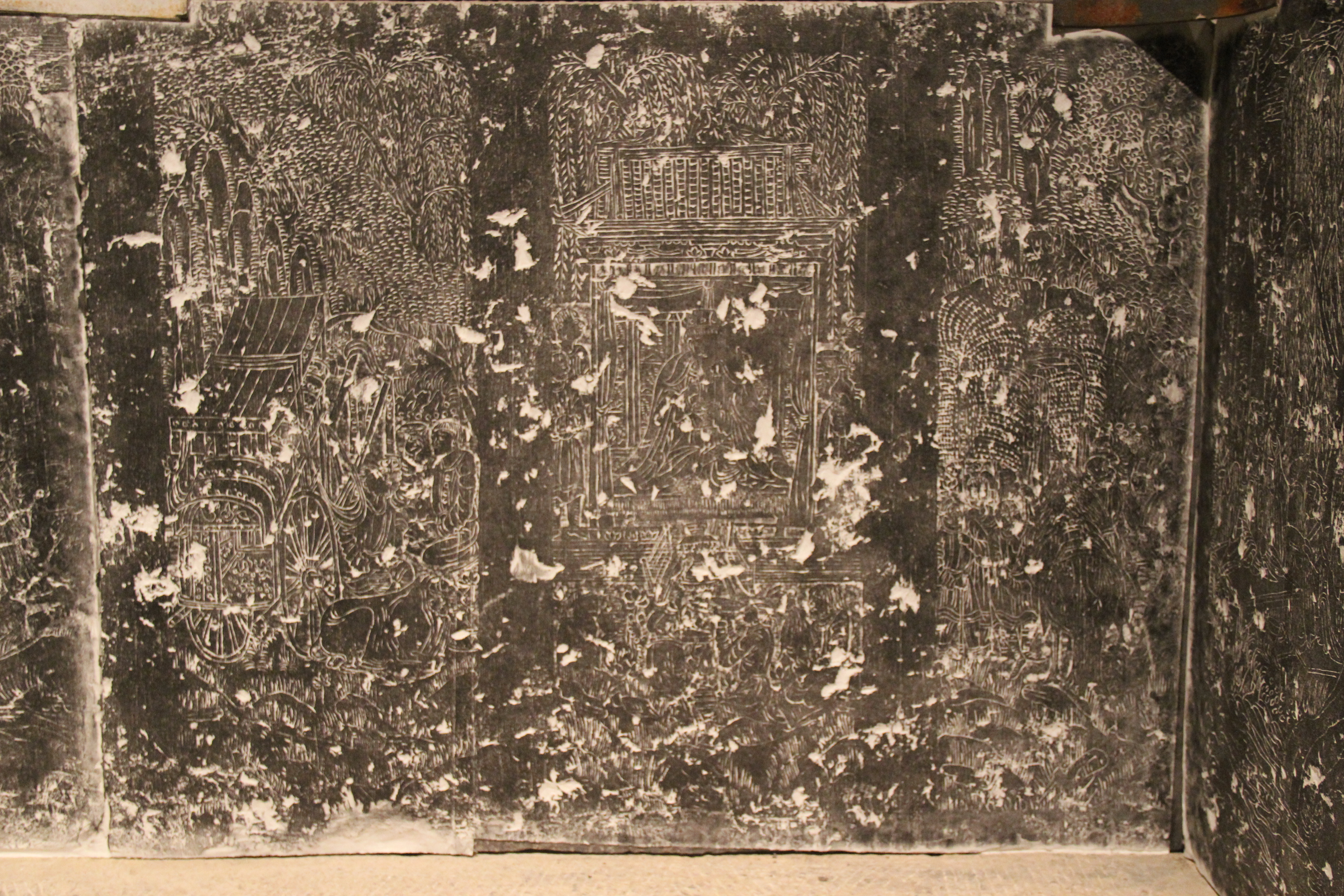
Decorated panels

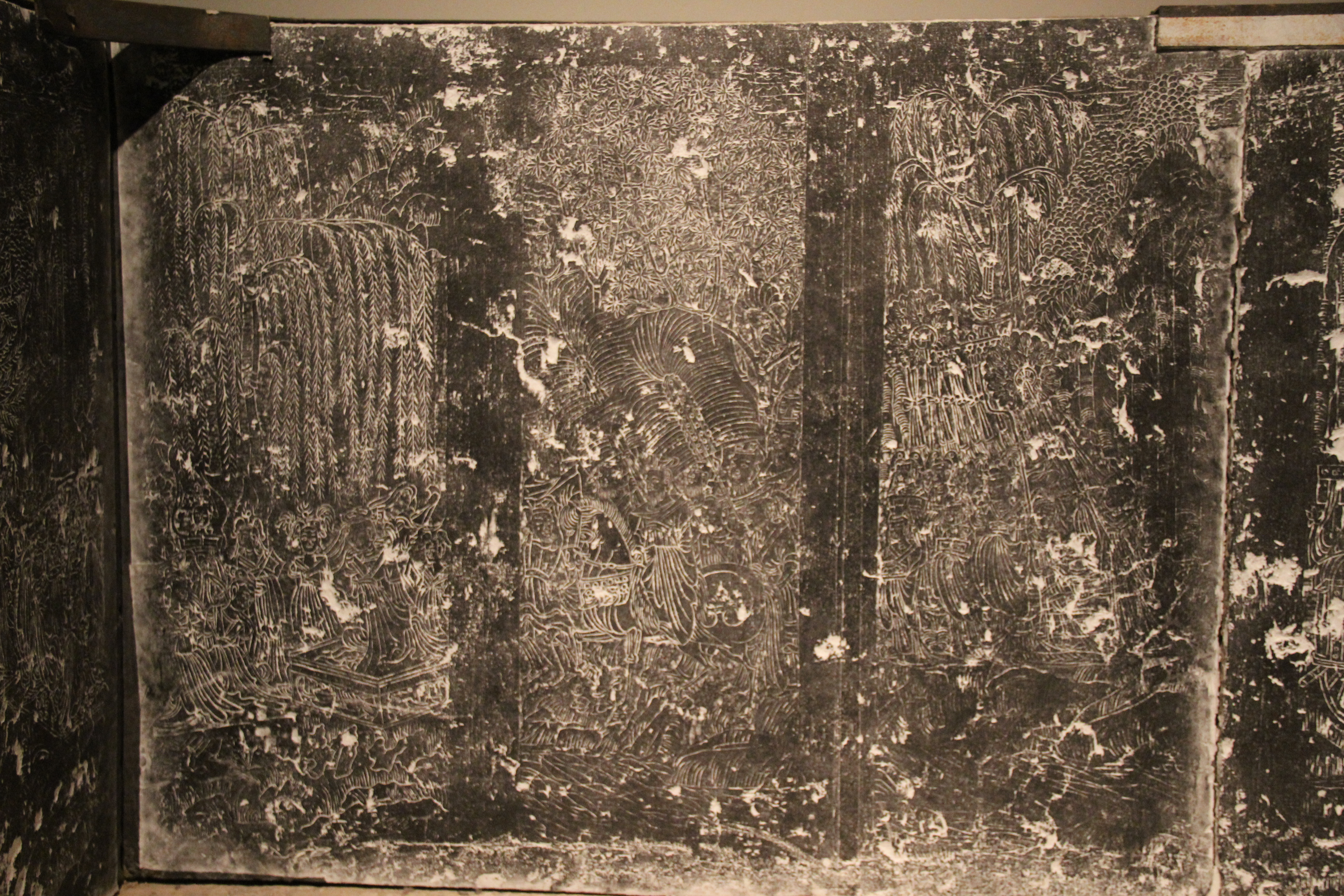
Decorated panels

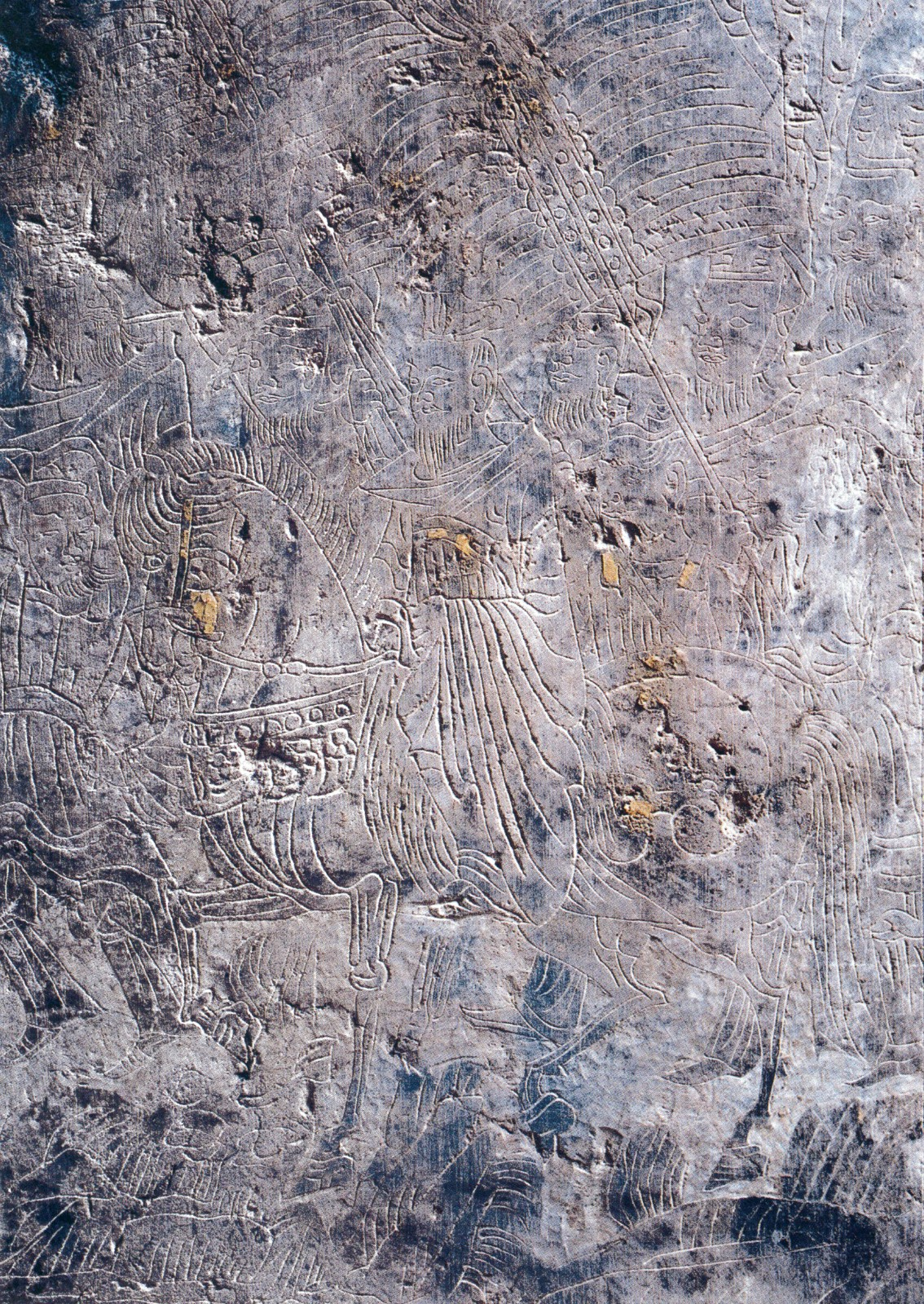
Tomb of Kang Ye, panel with the master on horseback.

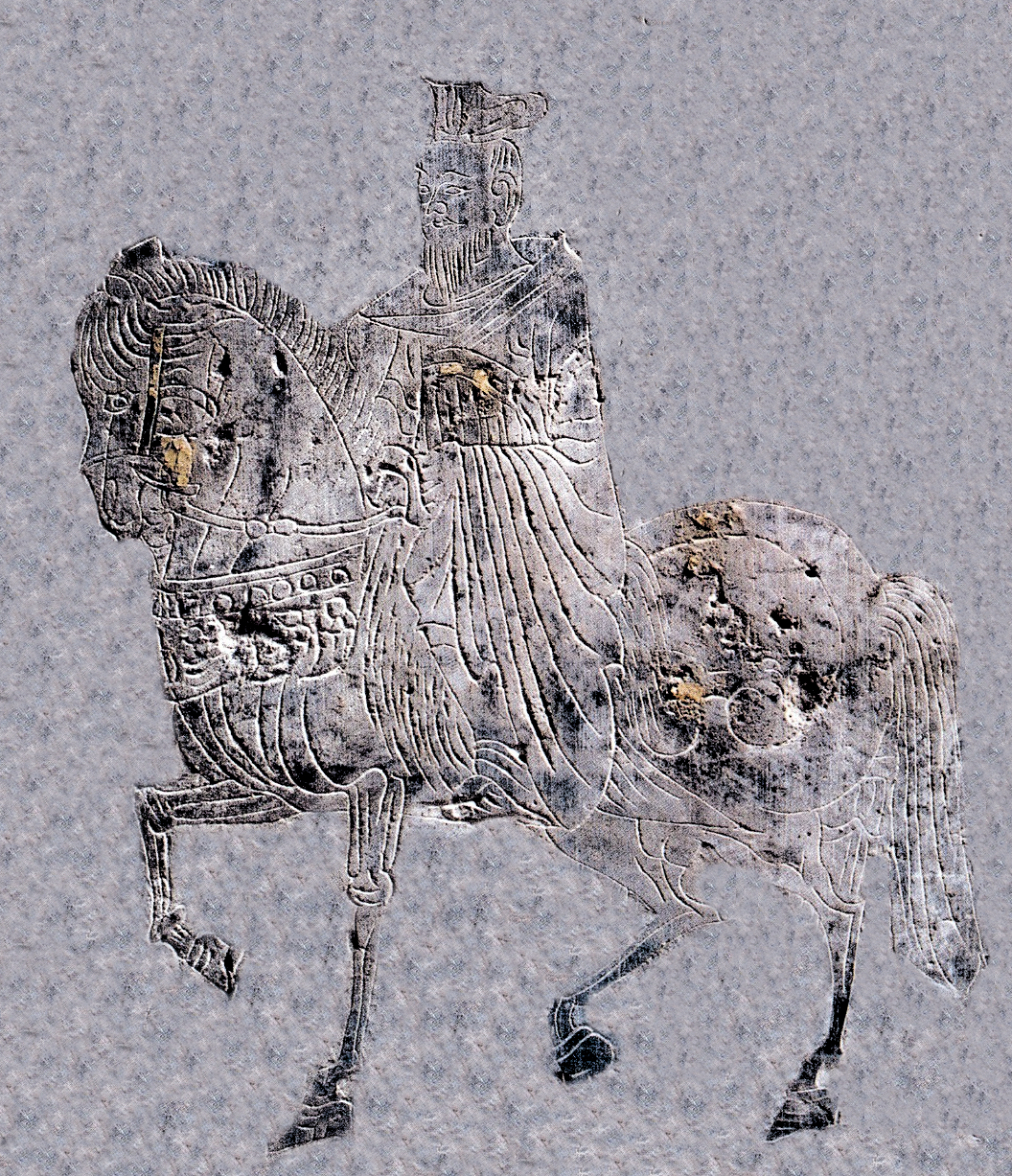
Tomb of Kang Ye, the master on horseback.

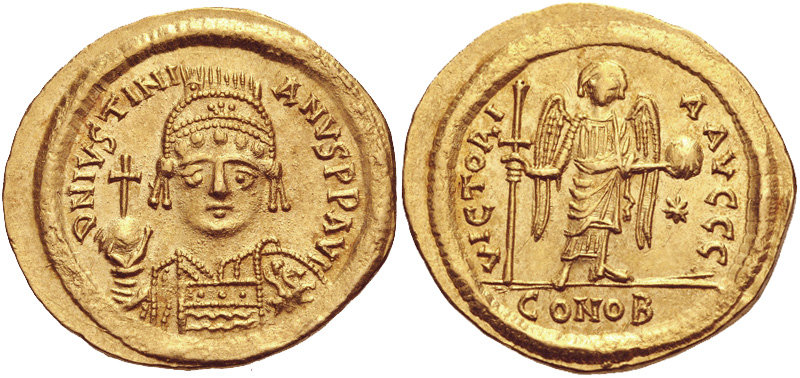
Coin of Justinian I of the type found in the tomb.

== See also ==
- Tomb of Li Dan
