= Dibek, Nusaybin =

Village in Mardin Province, Turkey

Dibek
- Neighbourhood
- Location within Turkey
- Coordinates: 37.208°N 41.445°E
- Country: Turkey
- Province: Mardin
- District: Nusaybin
- Population (2021): 45
- Time zone: UTC+3 (TRT)

Dibek, also known as Daskan, (Arabic: بادبة; Kurdish: Badibê; (Note: Also spelt as Badib or Bādip.) Syriac: ܒܝܬ ܕܒ̈ܐ, romanized: Beth Debe, lit. 'House of the Bear') (Note: Alternatively transliterated as Badabbah, Badabé, Bādebā, Bādebah, Badebbe, Badebe, Bādibbē, Badibe, Ba Dibbe, Beth Debbe, Beth-Debe, Bēth Dēbēh, Beth Debo, Beth Dibbe, or Bēth Diyūpē. Nisba: Bādibbōyo.) is a neighbourhood in the municipality and district of Nusaybin, Mardin Province in Turkey. The village is populated by Syriacs and Yazidi Kurds and had a population of 45 in 2021. It is located atop Mount Izla in the region of Beth Rishe in Tur Abdin.

In the village, there is a Syriac Orthodox church of Yūldaṯ Alohō.

== History ==
Beth Debe (today called Dibek) is attested in AD 776/777 (AG 1088) in an inscription, engraved by Cyril of Aynwardo, at the Mor Gabriel Monastery, in which it is recorded that stone which had been quarried at the village in 768/769 (AG 1080) by Zechariah of Aynwardo was transported to the monastery by his shawshbino (relative by sponsorship) Isaiah of Fofyath. In the Life of Gabriel of Qartmin, Mor Gabriel of Beth Qustan (d. 648) is credited with having commissioned the stone.

350 people from Beth Debe were killed by Hamza Beg in 1711. Three Syriac Orthodox monks from Beth Debe were recorded in 1870, including one named Gawriyyah residing in the village whilst another called Danḥā was at the nearby Monastery of Morī Ya‘qūb, and the third monk Yūsef was abbot of the Monastery of Mar Awgin. In the Syriac Orthodox patriarchal register of dues of 1870, it was recorded that the village had 34 households, who paid 136 dues, and had two priests. The Syriac Catholic bishop Gabriel Tappouni recorded that 250 Syriacs in 50 families populated Beth Debe in 1913 and were served by one priest. The village was inhabited by 250 or 400 Syriacs in 1914, as per the list presented to the Paris Peace Conference by the Assyro-Chaldean delegation. (Note: Badabé in the kaza of Habab (attached to the kaza of Nusaybin) is given a population of 250 whilst Badebé in the kaza of Midyat had 400 people.) They adhered to the Syriac Orthodox Church.

Amidst the Sayfo, refugees from neighbouring villages fled to Beth Debe, including 20 families from Sederi, 20 families from Kharabe-Mishka, and some from Mor Bobo, and they built defensive barriers. The villagers received weapons and ammunition from Sarokhano Agha, the temporary leader of the Chelebi faction of the Haverkan confederation, who also warned them the night before of the planned attack on Beth Debe. In early August, the village was attacked by the Hajo, Ali Batte, Doman, Chumaran, Dayre, Surgechi, Bunusra, Omaran, and Alike tribes in addition to Qaddur Bey with the Nisibis militia whilst the villagers were reinforced by one hundred armed men from the Monastery of Mor Malke. The battle lasted for fifteen days and nights until the Kurds retreated prior to the holiday of Saint Mary in mid-August and resulted in the death of 18 Syriacs and 30 Kurds. The Syriacs at Beth Debe then took refuge at the Mor Malke Monastery following the Kurds' withdrawal.

The village had a population of 356 in 1960. There were 410 Turoyo-speaking Christians in 65 families at the village in 1966. It was evacuated in the mid-1990s due to the activities of the PKK. The villagers eventually returned and repaired 35 houses and rebuilt 11 new houses between 2006 and 2010. The Church of the Virgin Mary was repaired and the Monastery of Mor Yakup of Qarno near the village was renovated and reopened for service in 2014.

== Demography ==
The following is a list of the number of Syriac families that have inhabited Beth Debe per year stated. Unless otherwise stated, all figures are from the list provided in The Syrian Orthodox Christians in the Late Ottoman Period and Beyond: Crisis then Revival, as noted in the bibliography below.

- 1915: 40
- 1966: 65
- 1978: 63
- 1979: 42
- 1981: 9
- 1987: 1
- 1988: 0

== Bibliography ==
- Atto, Naures (2011). Hostages in the Homeland, Orphans in the Diaspora: Identity Discourses Among the Assyrian/Syriac Elites in the European Diaspora (PDF). Leiden University Press.
- BarAbraham, Abdulmesih (2021). "Returning Home: The Ambivalent Assyrian Experience in Turkey". Poligrafi. 26 (101/102): 153–176. doi:10.35469/poligrafi.2021.282.
- Barsoum, Aphrem (2003). The Scattered Pearls: A History of Syriac Literature and Sciences. Translated by Matti Moosa (2nd ed.). Gorgias Press.
- Barsoum, Aphrem (2008). The History of Tur Abdin. Translated by Matti Moosa. Gorgias Press.
- Bcheiry, Iskandar (2009). The Syriac Orthodox Patriarchal Register of Dues of 1870: An Unpublished Historical Document from the Late Ottoman Period. Gorgias Press.
- Bcheiry, Iskandar (2010). Collection of Historical Documents in Relation with the Syriac Orthodox Community in the Late Period of the Ottoman Empire. Gorgias Press.
- Biner, Zerrin Özlem (2020). States of Dispossession: Violence and Precarious Coexistence in Southeast Turkey. University of Pennsylvania Press.
- Courtois, Sébastien de (2004). The Forgotten Genocide: Eastern Christians, The Last Arameans. Translated by Vincent Aurora. Gorgias Press.
- Dinno, Khalid S. (2017). The Syrian Orthodox Christians in the Late Ottoman Period and Beyond: Crisis then Revival. Gorgias Press.
- Gaunt, David (2006). Massacres, Resistance, Protectors: Muslim-Christian Relations in Eastern Anatolia during World War I. Gorgias Press.
- Jongerden, Joost; Verheij, Jelle, eds. (2012). Social Relations in Ottoman Diyarbekir, 1870-1915. Brill.
- Palmer, Andrew (1990). Monk and Mason on the Tigris Frontier: The Early History of Tur Abdin. Cambridge University Press.
- Ritter, Hellmut (1967). Turoyo: Die Volkssprache der Syrischen Christen des Tur 'Abdin (in German). Vol. 1. Franz Steiner Verlag.
- Tan, Altan (2018). Turabidin'den Berriye'ye. Aşiretler - Dinler - Diller - Kültürler (in Turkish). Pak Ajans Yayincilik Turizm Ve Diş Ticaret Limited şirketi. ISBN 9789944360944.
- Turan, Ahmet (1993). Yezidiler Tarihçeleri Coğrafi Dağılımları İnançları Örf ve Adetleri (in Turkish).
