= Odabaşı, Nusaybin =

Village in Mardin Province, Turkey

Odabaşı
- Neighbourhood
- Location in Turkey
- Coordinates: 37.104°N 41.462°E
- Country: Turkey
- Province: Mardin
- District: Nusaybin
- Population (2021): 686
- Time zone: UTC+3 (TRT)

Odabaşı (Note: Also spelt as Adabashi.) (Kurdish: Gündkē Şukro, lit. 'village of Şukro'; (Note: Also spelt as Gündükschükrü, Gündükshükrü, Gundik Şukrî, Gündük Şukro, Gündükke Shükro, Gündükşükro, Gündüşükrü, or Gündükşükrü.) Syriac: Qritho di’ Ito) (Note: Alternatively transliterated as Qritho d’Ito or Qritho d-Idto. Also known as Igündüke di'Ito ("village with the church" in Syriac), Malkī Šekrū, or Qritha d-Gunduk.) is a village in the municipality and district of Nusaybin, Mardin Province in Turkey. The village is populated by Syriacs and by Kurds of the Mizizex and Omerkan tribes. It had a population of 686 in 2021.

== History ==
In the Syriac Orthodox patriarchal register of dues of 1870, it was recorded that Qritho di’ Ito (today called Odabaşı) had 28 households, who paid 128 dues, and was served by one priest. There was a church of Morī Abrohom. Most of the Syriacs in the village originated in Hebob. The Syriacs at Qritho di’ Ito adhered to the Syriac Orthodox Church. The village was known for the production of cotton and was owned by the Malke Gawriye family.

Amidst the Sayfo, in April, 15 soldiers and the Turkish commander Sheyhe Dolmaji came to the village seeking deserters from the army, but after having tortured some deserters, the commander was killed and the soldiers chased off by the villagers who subsequently took their valuables and found refuge at Hebob. Syriacs from the village of Qewetla who had fled to Qritho di’ Ito before continuing on to Beth-Debe were all killed by Al-Khamsin militia under Qaddur Bey and Dakshuri Kurds.

The village had a population of 516 in 1960. A church was built in the village in 1965. In 1966, Qritho di’ Ito was inhabited by 600 Turoyo-speaking Christians in 90 families. The village had 800 Turoyo-speakers at one point in the 1960s. The village had a school in 1981. In 1995, 6 Syriac families from Mār Bōbo abandoned their village and moved to Qritho di’ Ito. It was reported that Kurds had illegally seized agricultural fields belonging to Syriacs from the village in 2020.

== Demography ==
The following is a list of the number of Syriac families that have inhabited Qritho di’ Ito per year stated. Unless otherwise stated, all figures are from the list provided in The Syrian Orthodox Christians in the Late Ottoman Period and Beyond: Crisis then Revival, as noted in the bibliography below.

- 1915: 50
- 1966: 90
- 1978: 106
- 1979: 102
- 1981: 70
- 1987: 40
- 1995: 9
- 1997: 15

== Bibliography ==
- Andrews, Peter Alford; Benninghaus, Rüdiger, eds. (1989). Ethnic Groups in the Republic of Turkey.
- Atto, Naures (2011). Hostages in the Homeland, Orphans in the Diaspora: Identity Discourses Among the Assyrian/Syriac Elites in the European Diaspora (PDF). Leiden University Press.
- BarAbraham, Abdulmesih (2021). "Returning Home: The Ambivalent Assyrian Experience in Turkey". Poligrafi. 26 (101/102): 153–176. doi:10.35469/poligrafi.2021.282.
- Bcheiry, Iskandar (2009). The Syriac Orthodox Patriarchal Register of Dues of 1870: An Unpublished Historical Document from the Late Ottoman Period. Gorgias Press.
- Courtois, Sébastien de (2004). The Forgotten Genocide: Eastern Christians, The Last Arameans. Translated by Vincent Aurora. Gorgias Press.
- Courtois, Sébastien de (2013). "Tur Abdin: Réflexions sur l'état présent descommunautés syriaques du Sud-Est de la Turquie, mémoire, exils, retours". Cahier du Gremmamo (in French). 21: 113–150.
- Dinno, Khalid S. (2017). The Syrian Orthodox Christians in the Late Ottoman Period and Beyond: Crisis then Revival. Gorgias Press.
- Gaunt, David (2006). Massacres, Resistance, Protectors: Muslim-Christian Relations in Eastern Anatolia during World War I. Gorgias Press.
- Hollerweger, Hans; Palmer, Andrew (1999). Turabdin: Living Cultural Heritage (in English, German, and Turkish) (2nd ed.). Friends of Tur Abdin.
- Jongerden, Joost; Verheij, Jelle, eds. (2012). Social Relations in Ottoman Diyarbekir, 1870-1915. Brill.
- Ritter, Hellmut (1967). Turoyo: Die Volkssprache der Syrischen Christen des Tur 'Abdin (in German). Vol. 1. Franz Steiner Verlag.
- Tan, Altan (2018). Turabidin'den Berriye'ye. Aşiretler - Dinler - Diller - Kültürler (in Turkish). Pak Ajans Yayincilik Turizm Ve Diş Ticaret Limited şirketi. ISBN 978-9944-360-94-4.
