= Üçköy, Nusaybin =

Village in Mardin Province, Turkey

Üçköy
- Neighbourhood
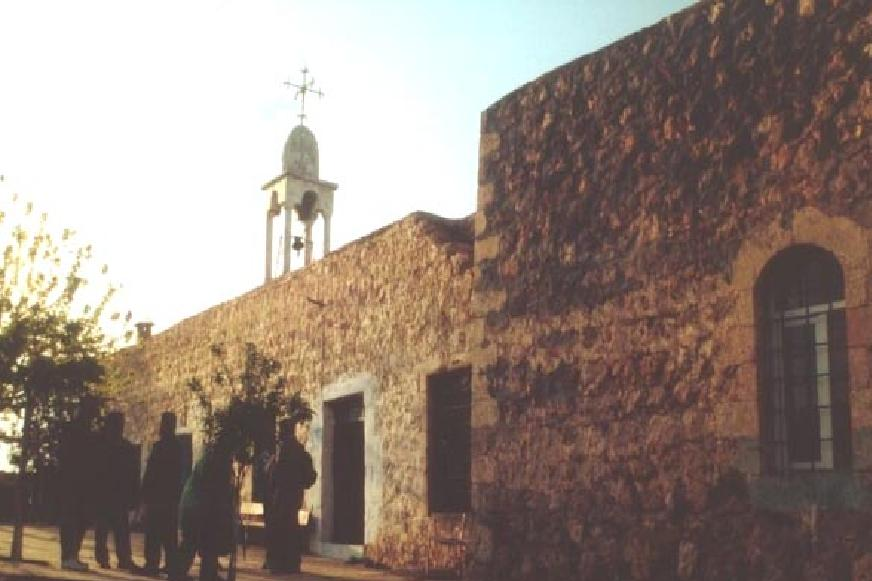
- Church of Mor Ephraim and Mor Theodorus

- Location within Turkey
- Coordinates: 37.258°N 41.437°E
- Country: Turkey
- Province: Mardin
- District: Nusaybin
- Population (2024): 465
- Time zone: UTC+3 (TRT)

Üçköy (Kurdish: Xarābê Alê, lit. 'ruins'; (Note: Also spelt as Harabalé, Harabale, Ḫarābālī, Harabali, Harab-Allé, Harapali, Kharaba Aleh, Kharabalé, Kharabalī, or Xarabe-ale. Nisba: Xarābālī.) Syriac: ܐܪܟܚ, romanized: Arkaḥ) (Note: Alternatively translitered as Arkāḥ or Ârkah. Also known as Xarābāle.) is a neighbourhood in the municipality and district of Nusaybin, Mardin Province in Turkey. The village is populated by Syriacs. (Note: For the use of the term "Syriac" to refer to the population of Arkaḥ. For use of the term "Assyrian". The terms "Syriac" and "Assyrian" are used to refer to the same group of people.) It had a population of 465 in 2024. It is located in the region of Beth Rishe in Tur Abdin.

In the village, there is the Syriac Orthodox Church of Mor Ephraim and Mor Theodorus.

== History ==
Arkaḥ (today called Üçköy) is mentioned in the Life of Malke, in which it is noted that Mor Malke resided near the village, where he performed several miracles and gained Šlémūn bar Wahbūn as a disciple. The Mor Malke Monastery was founded near the village about the sixth century and is believed to have hosted a Zoroastrian cult. Arkaḥ was inhabited by adherents of the Church of the East until it was abandoned and lost its name. It became known as Harabalé ("ruins"), but was eventually resettled by Syriac Orthodox Christians in the 1830s and the Church of Mor Ephraim and Mor Theodorus was rebuilt. In the Syriac Orthodox patriarchal register of dues of 1870, it was recorded that the village had 40 households, who paid 63 dues, and was served by the Church of Morī Tawodoros and two priests. The Church of Mor Ephraim and Mor Theodorus was in ruins when the village was visited by Gertrude Bell in 1909.

The Syriac Catholic bishop Gabriel Tappouni recorded that the village was populated by 400 Syriac Orthodox Christians in 80 families and were served by one priest in 1913. In 1914, Arkaḥ was inhabited by 300 or 400 Syriacs, according to the list presented to the Paris Peace Conference by the Assyro-Chaldean delegation. (Note: It has been suggested that the village was erroneously listed twice, as Harabali with a population of 300 in the kaza of Habab (attached to the kaza of Nusaybin) and Harab-Allé with a population of 400 in the kaza of Midyat.) Amidst the Sayfo, the village's population took refuge at the Mor Malke Monastery. The population of the village was 743 in 1960. There were 950 Turoyo-speaking Christians in 120 families in 1966. In the late 20th century, a number of villagers emigrated to Germany. The village had a priest in 1979. In 1981, the village had a school.

Arkaḥ was the only village in the region of Beth Rishe that was not evacuated in the 1990s due to the activities of the PKK. Less than 100 people in 25 families remained in the village. By 1999, the village had a priest, but did not have a school or a physician. As a consequence of the Turkish government's appeal to Syriacs to return to their homeland in 2001, 6 families from Istanbul and abroad subsequently returned to the village. In the early 2000s, a football field was established in the village whilst the streets were widened and cleared to be made accessible for cars in the mid-2000s. The Church of Mor Ephraim and Mor Theodorus was repaired between 2009 and 2011. A new village hall was constructed at Arkaḥ in 2014–2019. By 2019, it was inhabited by 270 people in 68 families.

On 9 January 2020, Sefer (Aho) Bileçen, a monk at the Mor Yakub Monastery, the village headman Jozef Yar, and a villager were arrested by the Turkish Gendarmerie at Arkaḥ. Bileçen was charged with joining the People's Defense Forces of the PKK the following month, and in 2021 was sentenced to two years and one month in prison. In August 2023, the Governor of Mardin declared Arkaḥ, alongside eight other villages, as a "special security zone" in the event of military operations. The village would receive this status once again for a 15-day period the following year. To help revive the local economy, a number of Syriacs have returned to Arkah from the diaspora and have opened businesses as recently as 2023. In recent years, the village has become well known for its pizza making, alongside Elbeğendi. The village's water infrastructure was repaired in January 2025. On 17 August, Arkah inaugurated a new community centre in a ceremony led by Archbishop Mor Timotheus Shmuel Aktaş, attended by locals and diaspora members.

== Demography ==
=== Families ===
The following is a list of the number of Syriac families that have inhabited Arkaḥ per year stated. Unless otherwise stated, all figures are from the list provided in The Syrian Orthodox Christians in the Late Ottoman Period and Beyond: Crisis then Revival, as noted in the bibliography below. (Note: The size of a single family varies between five and ten persons.)

- 1915: 70
- 1966: 120
- 1978: 103
- 1979: 92
- 1981: 88
- 1987: 70
- 1995: 38
- 1999: 25
- 2013: 45
- 2019: 68

=== Population ===
Historical population
Year	Pop.	±% p.a.
1997	219	—
2007	88	−8.71%
2012	316	+29.13%
2017	364	+2.87%
2022	438	+3.77%
2024	465	+3.04%
Source: Population census (1997) and TÜİK (2007-2024)

== Bibliography ==
- Al-Jeloo, Nicholas (2015). "Transferrable Religious Heritage: Church Buildings in Northern Mesopotamia". Le patrimoine architectural de l'Église orthodoxe d'Antioche: Perspectives comparatives avec les autres groupes religieux du Moyen-Orient et des régions limitrophes. Publications of the University of Balamand. pp. 111–127.
- BarAbraham, Abdulmesih (2021). "Returning Home: The Ambivalent Assyrian Experience in Turkey". Poligrafi. 26 (101/102): 153–176. doi:10.35469/poligrafi.2021.282.
- Barsoum, Aphrem (2003). The Scattered Pearls: A History of Syriac Literature and Sciences. Translated by Matti Moosa (2nd ed.). Gorgias Press.
- Barsoum, Aphrem (2008). The History of Tur Abdin. Translated by Matti Moosa. Gorgias Press.
- Bcheiry, Iskandar (2009). The Syriac Orthodox Patriarchal Register of Dues of 1870: An Unpublished Historical Document from the Late Ottoman Period. Gorgias Press.
- Biner, Zerrin Özlem (2020). States of Dispossession: Violence and Precarious Coexistence in Southeast Turkey. University of Pennsylvania Press.
- Brock, Sebastian (2021). "The Syrian Orthodox Church in the twentieth century". Eastern Christianity, Theological Reflection on Religion, Culture, and Politics in the Holy Land and Christian Encounter with Islam and the Muslim World (PDF). Living Stones of the Holy Land Trust. pp. 155–181.
- Courtois, Sébastien de (2004). The Forgotten Genocide: Eastern Christians, The Last Arameans. Translated by Vincent Aurora. Gorgias Press.
- Courtois, Sébastien de (2013). "Tur Abdin : Réflexions sur l'état présent descommunautés syriaques du Sud-Est de la Turquie,mémoire, exils, retours". Cahier du Gremmamo (in French). 21: 113–150.
- Dinno, Khalid S. (2017). The Syrian Orthodox Christians in the Late Ottoman Period and Beyond: Crisis then Revival. Gorgias Press.
- Fiey, Jean Maurice (2004). Lawrence Conrad (ed.). Saints Syriaques (in French). The Darwin Press.
- Gaunt, David (2006). Massacres, Resistance, Protectors: Muslim-Christian Relations in Eastern Anatolia during World War I. Gorgias Press.
- Günaysu, Ayşe (2019). Safety Of The Life Of Nun Verde Gökmen In The Village Zaz (Izbirak) — Midyat, Tur Abdin – And The General Social Situation Of The Assyrian Villages In The Region (PDF) (Report). Translated by Abdulmesih BarAbraham. Human Rights Association Commission Against Racism and Discrimination.
- Güsten, Susanne (2016). A Farewell to Tur Abdin (PDF).
- Hollerweger, Hans; Palmer, Andrew (1999). Turabdin: Living Cultural Heritage (in English, German, and Turkish) (2nd ed.). Friends of Tur Abdin.
- Jongerden, Joost; Verheij, Jelle, eds. (2012). Social Relations in Ottoman Diyarbekir, 1870-1915. Brill.
- Omtzigt, Pieter; Tozman, Markus K.; Tyndall, Andrea, eds. (2012). The Slow Disappearance of the Syriacs from Turkey and of the Grounds of the Mor Gabriel Monastery (PDF). LIT Verlag Münster.
- Palmer, Andrew (1990). Monk and Mason on the Tigris Frontier: The Early History of Tur Abdin. Cambridge University Press.
- Ritter, Hellmut (1967). Turoyo: Die Volkssprache der Syrischen Christen des Tur 'Abdin (in German). Vol. 1. Franz Steiner Verlag.
- Tan, Altan (2018). Turabidin'den Berriye'ye. Aşiretler - Dinler - Diller - Kültürler (in Turkish). Pak Ajans Yayincilik Turizm Ve Diş Ticaret Limited şirketi. ISBN 9789944360944.
