= Bağlarbaşı, Midyat =

Village in Mardin Province, Turkey

Bağlarbaşı
- Neighbourhood
- Location within Turkey
- Coordinates: 37.455°N 41.459°E
- Country: Turkey
- Province: Mardin
- District: Midyat
- Population (2021): 401
- Time zone: UTC+3 (TRT)

Bağlarbaşı (Kurdish: Arnas; Syriac: ܥܪܢܐܣ, romanized: Urnus) (Note: Alternatively transliterated as ʿArdnas, ‘Arnes, Azbas, Urdnas, Urdnus, or ‘Urnes. Nisba: ‘Urnōsōyo or ‘Urdnusoyo.) is a neighbourhood in the municipality and district of Midyat, Mardin Province in Turkey. The village is populated by Syriacs and by Kurds of the Arnas tribe and had a population of 401 in 2021. It is located in the historic region of Tur Abdin.

In the village, there is a church of Mar Basus and Mar Cyriacus.

== History ==
A church was constructed at Urnus (today called Bağlarbaşı) by Emperor Anastasius I Dicorus (r. 491–518) and designed by the architects Theodosius and Theodorus according to a manuscript dated to 1592, however the historian Andrew Palmer argues this was fabricated to add historicity. The Church of Mar Basus and Mar Cyriacus at Urnus, also called simply the Church of Mar Cyriacus, was probably constructed in the late seventh century AD. It was built by 761/762 (AG 1072) at the latest as indicated by an inscription at the church commemorating the construction of a templon screen by the priest Elijah in that year. The monk-priest Yusuf (Joseph) of Urnus, son of the priest Ṣaliba, was a reputable calligrapher (fl. 1457–1459).

The entirety of the church's northern wall, including the arcade, and most of the vault was rebuilt in 1591/1592 (AG 1903) by maqdisi Yusuf, son of Emmanuel and the priest Habil (Abel) and his son Jaladi. Cyril Denha of Urnus was ordained as a bishop by Ignatius Habib, Patriarch of Tur Abdin (r. 1674–1707). Ignatius Denha, Patriarch of Tur Abdin (r. 1707–1725), was from Urnus. Basilius Denha Baltaji, Maphrian of Tur Abdin (r. 1740–1779), was born at Urnus. Cyril Jacob of Urnus was ordained as a metropolitan bishop of the patriarchal office by Ignatius Barsoum, Patriarch of Tur Abdin (r. 1740–1791). Cyril Jacob Mirijan of Urnus was metropolitan bishop of Midyat in 1783–1804. Ignatius Yusuf of Urnus was an illegitimate patriarch of Tur Abdin in 1805–1834. In the Syriac Orthodox patriarchal register of dues of 1870, it was recorded that the village had 52 households, who paid 162 dues, and had one priest. There was a church of Morī Isṭefānūs. The monk ‘Abd al-Masih of Urnus was superior of the Mor Hananyo Monastery in 1905–1906.

In 1914, the village was inhabited by 350 Syriacs, according to the list presented to the Paris Peace Conference by the Assyro-Chaldean delegation. Most of the Christians at Urnus adhered to the Syriac Orthodox Church although there were ten Protestant families. It served as the residence of the chief of the Dakshuri tribal confederation, Osman Tammero. The Dakshuri confederation included the Arnas tribe, which consisted of both Syriacs and Kurds. Kurds likely constituted the majority of the village's population. Amidst the Sayfo, upon learning of the massacre at Saleh and hearing gunshots from Midyat, Syriacs at Urnus opted to take refuge at ‘Ayn-Wardo and managed to force themselves past Kurds who attempted to stop them, whilst 23 Syriac men who remained were murdered the next day. A few Syriacs who attempted to return to the village were shot.

The population of the village was 984 in 1960. There were 390 Turoyo-speaking Christians in 63 families in 1966. The Syriacs at Urnus emigrated to Germany in the second half of the 20th century. The final Christian left the village in 1991.

== Demography ==
The following is a list of the number of Syriac families that have inhabited Urnus per year stated. Unless otherwise stated, all figures are from the list provided in The Syrian Orthodox Christians in the Late Ottoman Period and Beyond: Crisis then Revival, as noted in the bibliography below.

- 1915: 70
- 1966: 63
- 1978: 38
- 1979: 36
- 1981: 28
- 1987: 20

== Bibliography ==
- Barsoum, Aphrem (2003). The Scattered Pearls: A History of Syriac Literature and Sciences. Translated by Matti Moosa (2nd ed.). Gorgias Press.
- Barsoum, Aphrem (2008a). History of the Za'faran Monastery. Translated by Matti Moosa. Gorgias Press.
- Barsoum, Aphrem (2008b). The History of Tur Abdin. Translated by Matti Moosa. Gorgias Press.
- Barsoum, Aphrem (2009). History of the Syriac Dioceses. Vol. 1. Translated by Matti Moosa. Gorgias Press.
- Bcheiry, Iskandar (2009). The Syriac Orthodox Patriarchal Register of Dues of 1870: An Unpublished Historical Document from the Late Ottoman Period. Gorgias Press.
- Bcheiry, Iskandar (2019). "Digitizing and Schematizing the Archival Material from the Late Ottoman Period Found in the Monastery of al-Zaʿfarān in Southeast Turkey". Atla Summary of Proceedings. 72 (January): 50–61. doi:10.31046/proceedings.2018.113.
- Biner, Zerrin Özlem (2020). States of Dispossession: Violence and Precarious Coexistence in Southeast Turkey. University of Pennsylvania Press.
- Birol, Simon (2017). "Interpretation of the 'Sayfo' in Gallo Shabo's Poem". In David Gaunt; Naures Atto; Soner O. Barthoma (eds.). Let Them Not Return: Sayfo – The Genocide against the Assyrian, Syriac and Chaldean Christians in the Ottoman Empire (PDF). pp. 157–177.
- Courtois, Sébastien de (2004). The Forgotten Genocide: Eastern Christians, The Last Arameans. Translated by Vincent Aurora. Gorgias Press.
- Courtois, Sébastien de (2013). "Tur Abdin : Réflexions sur l'état présent descommunautés syriaques du Sud-Est de la Turquie, mémoire, exils, retours". Cahier du Gremmamo (in French). 21: 113–150.
- Dinno, Khalid S. (2017). The Syrian Orthodox Christians in the Late Ottoman Period and Beyond: Crisis then Revival. Gorgias Press.
- Gaunt, David (2006). Massacres, Resistance, Protectors: Muslim-Christian Relations in Eastern Anatolia during World War I. Gorgias Press.
- Jongerden, Joost; Verheij, Jelle, eds. (2012). Social Relations in Ottoman Diyarbekir, 1870-1915. Brill.
- Keser-Kayaalp, Elif (2019). "Church Building in the Ṭur 'Abdin in the First Centuries of the Islamic Rule". In Alain Delattre; Marie Legendre; Petra Sijpesteijn (eds.). Authority and Control in the Countryside: From Antiquity to Islam in the Mediterranean and Near East (Sixth-Tenth Century). Leiden-Boston: Brill. pp. 176–209. ISBN 9789004386549.
- Palmer, Andrew (1990). Monk and Mason on the Tigris Frontier: The Early History of Tur Abdin. Cambridge University Press.
- Ritter, Hellmut (1967). Turoyo: Die Volkssprache der Syrischen Christen des Tur 'Abdin (in German). Vol. 1. Franz Steiner Verlag.
- Sinclair, T.A. (1989). Eastern Turkey: An Architectural and Archaeological Survey. Vol. 3. Pindar Press. ISBN 0-907132-34-0.
- Tan, Altan (2018). Turabidin'den Berriye'ye. Aşiretler - Dinler - Diller - Kültürler (in Turkish). Pak Ajans Yayincilik Turizm Ve Diş Ticaret Limited şirketi. ISBN 9789944360944.
