= Elbeğendi, Midyat =

Village in Mardin Province, Turkey

Elbeğendi
- Neighbourhood
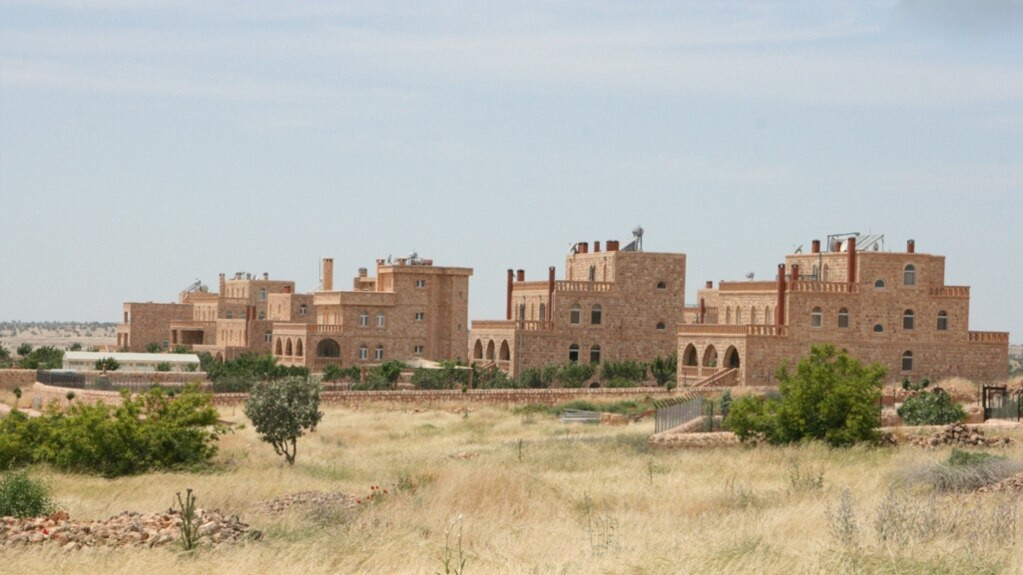

- Location within Turkey
- Coordinates: 37.283°N 41.408°E
- Country: Turkey
- Province: Mardin
- District: Midyat
- Population (2021): 46
- Time zone: UTC+3 (TRT)

Elbeğendi (Kurdish: Xerabê Kefrê; (Note: Also spelt as Harabekefri, Harabkefri, Harapkefri, Haraba Kefri, Kharaba Kafra, Kharaba Kefri, Keferi, or Xırabê Käfrê.) Syriac: Kafro Tahtoyo, lit. 'Lower village') (Note: Alternatively transliterated as Käfro taḥtäito, Kafro Tachtayto, Kafro-Tahtayo, Kafro Tahtayto, or Kafro Tahtoyto. Also called Lower Kafro or simply Kafro, in contrast with Upper Kafro (Kafro Elayto). Also known as Ḫarābī Kafrō. Nisba: Käfrōyo.) is a neighbourhood of the municipality and district of Midyat, Mardin Province in Turkey. The village is populated by Syriacs and had a population of 46 in 2021. (Note: For the use of the term "Syriac" to refer to the population of Kafro Tahtoyo. For use of the term "Assyrian". The terms "Syriac" and "Assyrian" are used to refer to the same group of people.) It is located atop Mount Izla in the region of Beth Rishe in Tur Abdin.

In the village, there is the Church of Mor Yaqub and Mor Barsaum and the Chapel of Our Lady.

== History ==
In the Syriac Orthodox patriarchal register of dues of 1870, it was recorded that Kafro Tahtoyo (today called Elbeğendi) had 17 households, who paid 22 dues, and was served by the Church of Morī Ya‘qūb, but did not have a priest. In 1914, it was inhabited by 250 Syriacs, according to the list presented to the Paris Peace Conference by the Assyro-Chaldean delegation. They belonged to the Syriac Orthodox Church. It was located in the kaza of Habab (attached to the kaza of Nusaybin). Amidst the Sayfo, the village was attacked and some survivors took refuge at the nearby Monastery of Mor Malke whilst others went to ‘Ayn-Wardo. Several hundred Christians at the Mor Malke Monastery, mostly refugees from Kafro Tahtoyo, retaliated and attacked Sheweske on 21 August. About 8 families returned to the village in 1916.

There were 274 residents in 1960. By 1966, 310 Turoyo-speaking Christians in 37 families inhabited Kafro Tahtoyo. By 1994, only a few families remained in the village and most of the houses had been abandoned. The village was forcibly evacuated by the Turkish army in 1995 due to the Kurdish–Turkish conflict. The villagers emigrated abroad to Germany, Switzerland, and Sweden. The village, including the church and its graves, was consequently plundered and nearly completely destroyed and all the trees in the surrounding area were cut down.

In February 2002, the Syriac Orthodox Archbishop Timotheus Samuel Aktaş and two representatives from the village requested permission to return to Kafro Tahtoyo from the Governor of Mardin. The application was approved by Temel Koçaklar, the vali of Mardin, on 28 February 2002. The construction of new homes and renovations to the church began in 2004. In 2006, 17 Syriac families returned to the village from Augsburg and Göppingen in Germany, and Trüllikon and Zürich in Switzerland. To help revive the local economy, some returnees started businesses in the village. The Chapel of Our Lady at Kafro Tahtoyo was consecrated on 15 August 2008 with the financial support of the Evangelical-Lutheran Church in Württemberg. A Syriac man from Kafro Tahtoyo was shot by Kurdish shepherds in 2008 after he had instructed them to take their herds off his land. In late July 2019, Syriac properties in Kafro Tahtoyo were struck by suspected arson attacks.

== Demography ==
The following is a list of the number of Syriac families that have inhabited Kafro Tahtoyo per year stated. Unless otherwise stated, all figures are from the list provided in Eastern Christianity, Theological Reflection on Religion, Culture, and Politics in the Holy Land and Christian Encounter with Islam and the Muslim World, as noted in the bibliography below. (Note: The size of a single family varies between five and ten persons.)

- 1915: 30
- 1966: 37
- 1970: 46
- 1978: 44
- 1979: 37
- 1981: 23
- 1987: 15
- 1992: 5
- 2013: 12

== Notable people ==
- Iskender Alptekin (1961–2010), Syriac politician

== Bibliography ==
- Andrews, Peter Alford; Benninghaus, Rüdiger, eds. (1989). Ethnic Groups in the Republic of Turkey.
- BarAbraham, Abdulmesih (2021). "Returning Home: The Ambivalent Assyrian Experience in Turkey". Poligrafi. 26 (101/102): 153–176.
- Barsoum, Aphrem (2008). The History of Tur Abdin. Translated by Matti Moosa. Gorgias Press.
- Bcheiry, Iskandar (2009). The Syriac Orthodox Patriarchal Register of Dues of 1870: An Unpublished Historical Document from the Late Ottoman Period. Gorgias Press.
- Biner, Zerrin Özlem (2020). States of Dispossession: Violence and Precarious Coexistence in Southeast Turkey. University of Pennsylvania Press.
- Birol, Simon (2017). "Interpretation of the 'Sayfo' in Gallo Shabo's Poem". In David Gaunt; Naures Atto; Soner O. Barthoma (eds.). Let Them Not Return: Sayfo – The Genocide against the Assyrian, Syriac and Chaldean Christians in the Ottoman Empire (PDF). pp. 157–177.
- Brock, Sebastian (2021). "The Syrian Orthodox Church in the twentieth century". Eastern Christianity, Theological Reflection on Religion, Culture, and Politics in the Holy Land and Christian Encounter with Islam and the Muslim World (PDF). Living Stones of the Holy Land Trust. pp. 155–181.
- Çaglar, Ayşe (2013). "Rescaling cities, cultural diversity, and transnationalism: Migrants of Mardin and Essen". In Steven Vertovec (ed.). Anthropology of Migration and Multiculturalism: New Directions. Routledge. pp. 113–138.
- Courtois, Sébastien de (2004). The Forgotten Genocide: Eastern Christians, The Last Arameans. Translated by Vincent Aurora. Gorgias Press.
- Courtois, Sébastien de (2013). "Tur Abdin : Réflexions sur l'état présent descommunautés syriaques du Sud-Est de la Turquie, mémoire, exils, retours". Cahier du Gremmamo (in French). 21: 113–150.
- Gaunt, David (2006). Massacres, Resistance, Protectors: Muslim-Christian Relations in Eastern Anatolia during World War I. Gorgias Press.
- Güsten, Susanne (2016). A Farewell to Tur Abdin (PDF).
- Jongerden, Joost; Verheij, Jelle, eds. (2012). Social Relations in Ottoman Diyarbekir, 1870-1915. Brill.
- Keser Kayaalp, Elif (2021). Church Architecture of Late Antique Northern Mesopotamia. Oxford University Press.
- Oberkampf, Horst (2012). "Almost a Miracle – Syriacs are Returning to their Homelands". In Pieter Omtzigt; Markus K. Tozman; Andrea Tyndall (eds.). The Slow Disappearance of the Syriacs from Turkey and of the Grounds of the Mor Gabriel Monastery (PDF). LIT Verlag Münster. pp. 121–138.
- Omtzigt, Pieter; Tozman, Markus K.; Tyndall, Andrea, eds. (2012). The Slow Disappearance of the Syriacs from Turkey and of the Grounds of the Mor Gabriel Monastery (PDF). LIT Verlag Münster.
- Özüpekçe, Salman; Işık, Muhammed Said; Dalgıç, Sevgi (2023). "Midyat İlçesi Kırsal Yerleşmelerinin Toponimik Sınıflandırması ve Coğrafya Öğretiminde Toponimi Kavramı". Turkish Studies (in Turkish). 18 (4): 1633–1650. doi:10.7827/TurkishStudies.71374.
- Palmer, Andrew (1990). Monk and Mason on the Tigris Frontier: The Early History of Tur Abdin. Cambridge University Press.
- Ritter, Hellmut (1967). Turoyo: Die Volkssprache der Syrischen Christen des Tur 'Abdin (in German). Vol. 1. Franz Steiner Verlag.
- Samur, Hakan (2009). "Turkey's Europeanization Process and The Return of the Syriacs". Turkish Studies. 10 (3): 327–340.
- Sinclair, T.A. (1989). Eastern Turkey: An Architectural & Archaeological Survey. Vol. III. Pindar Press. ISBN 9780907132349.
