= Üçyol, Nusaybin =

Village in Mardin Province, Turkey

Üçyol
- Neighbourhood
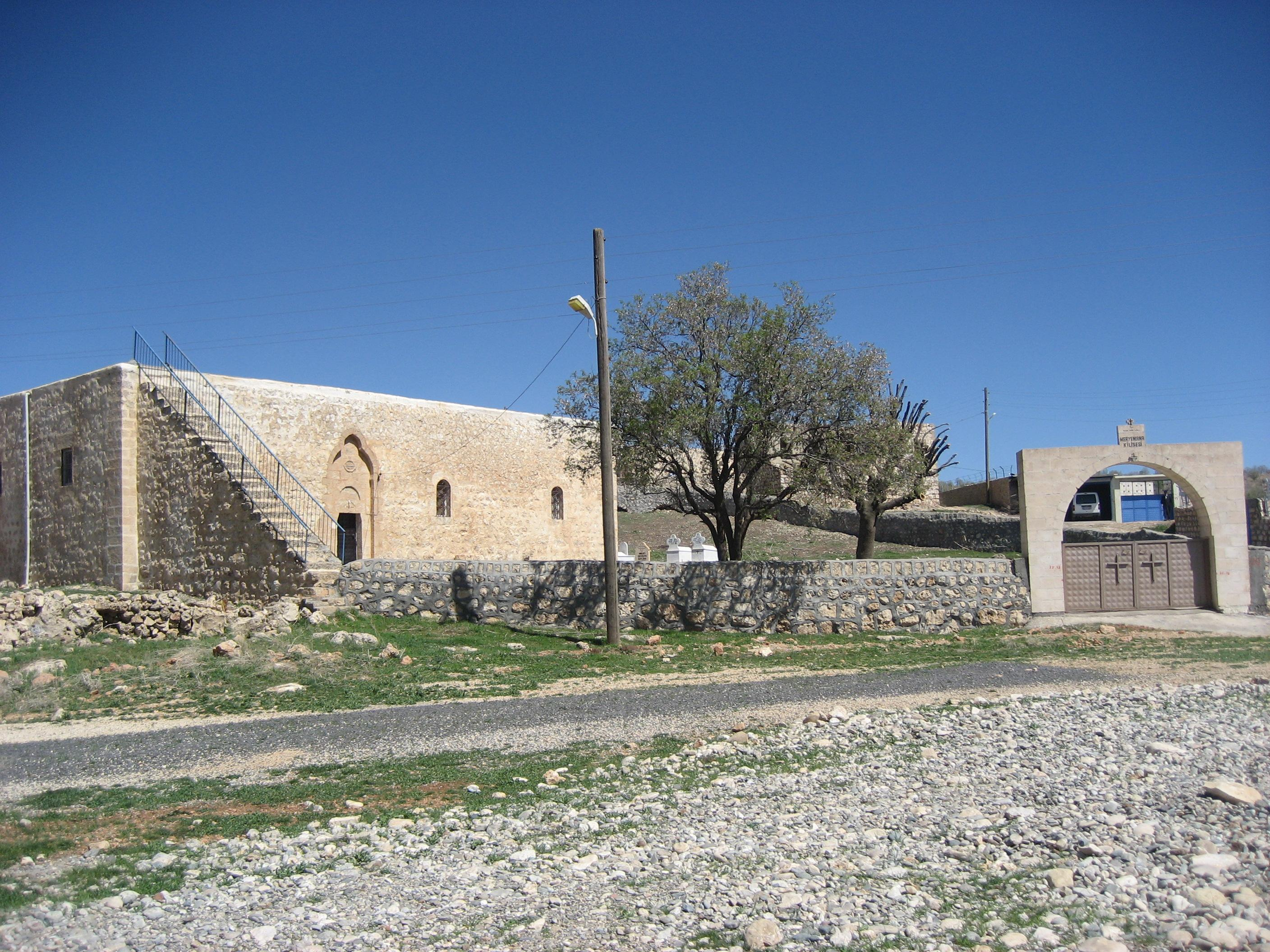
- Church of Yoldath Aloho

- Location within Turkey
- Coordinates: 37.216°N 41.408°E
- Country: Turkey
- Province: Mardin
- District: Nusaybin
- Population (2021): 64
- Time zone: UTC+3 (TRT)

Üçyol (Kurdish: Seyderi, lit. 'three gates'; (Note: Also spelt as Sêderiyê.) Syriac: Sīdrī) (Note: Alternatively transliterated as Saydari, Sedaré, Sēdäri, Sederi, or Sideri. Nisba: Sēdärī.) is a neighbourhood in the municipality and district of Nusaybin, Mardin Province in Turkey. The village is populated by Syriacs and had a population of 64 in 2021. It is located atop Mount Izla in the historic region of Tur Abdin.

== History ==
In the Syriac Orthodox patriarchal register of dues of 1870, it was recorded that Sīdrī (today called Üçyol) had 4 households, who did not pay any dues, and was served by the Church of Yūldaṯ Alohō, but did not have a priest. They adhered to the Syriac Orthodox Church. Amidst the Sayfo, survivors took refuge at the Mor Malke Monastery. The village had a population of 205 in 1960. There were 287 Turoyo-speaking Christians in 39 families in 1966. By 1999, it had been abandoned by the Christians.

== Demography ==
The following is a list of the number of Syriac families that have inhabited Sīdrī per year stated. Unless otherwise stated, all figures are from the list provided in The Syrian Orthodox Christians in the Late Ottoman Period and Beyond: Crisis then Revival, as noted in the bibliography below.

- 1915: 10/20 (Note: Courtois gives 10 families in 1915 whereas Dinno notes 20.)
- 1966: 39
- 1978: 36
- 1979: 35
- 1981: 22
- 1987: 18

== Bibliography ==
- Atto, Naures (2011). Hostages in the Homeland, Orphans in the Diaspora: Identity Discourses Among the Assyrian/Syriac Elites in the European Diaspora (PDF). Leiden University Press.
- Bcheiry, Iskandar (2009). The Syriac Orthodox Patriarchal Register of Dues of 1870: An Unpublished Historical Document from the Late Ottoman Period. Gorgias Press.
- Biner, Zerrin Özlem (2020). States of Dispossession: Violence and Precarious Coexistence in Southeast Turkey. University of Pennsylvania Press.
- Courtois, Sébastien de (2004). The Forgotten Genocide: Eastern Christians, The Last Arameans. Translated by Vincent Aurora. Gorgias Press.
- Dinno, Khalid S. (2017). The Syrian Orthodox Christians in the Late Ottoman Period and Beyond: Crisis then Revival. Gorgias Press.
- Gaunt, David (2006). Massacres, Resistance, Protectors: Muslim-Christian Relations in Eastern Anatolia during World War I. Gorgias Press.
- Günaysu, Ayşe (2019). Safety Of The Life Of Nun Verde Gökmen In The Village Zaz (Izbirak) — Midyat, Tur Abdin – And The General Social Situation Of The Assyrian Villages In The Region (PDF). Translated by Abdulmesih BarAbraham. Human Rights Association Commission Against Racism and Discrimination.
- Hollerweger, Hans; Palmer, Andrew (1999). Turabdin: Living Cultural Heritage (in English, German, and Turkish) (2nd ed.). Friends of Tur Abdin.
- Jongerden, Joost; Verheij, Jelle, eds. (2012). Social Relations in Ottoman Diyarbekir, 1870-1915. Brill.
- Ritter, Hellmut (1967). Turoyo: Die Volkssprache der Syrischen Christen des Tur 'Abdin (in German). Vol. 1. Franz Steiner Verlag.
- Tan, Altan (2018). Turabidin'den Berriye'ye. Aşiretler - Dinler - Diller - Kültürler (in Turkish). Pak Ajans Yayincilik Turizm Ve Diş Ticaret Limited şirketi. ISBN 9789944360944.
