= Mor Yakup Monastery (Midyat) =

Monastery in Mardin Province, Turkey

Coordinates: 37.4833°N 41.3967°E

- Mor Yakup Manastırı
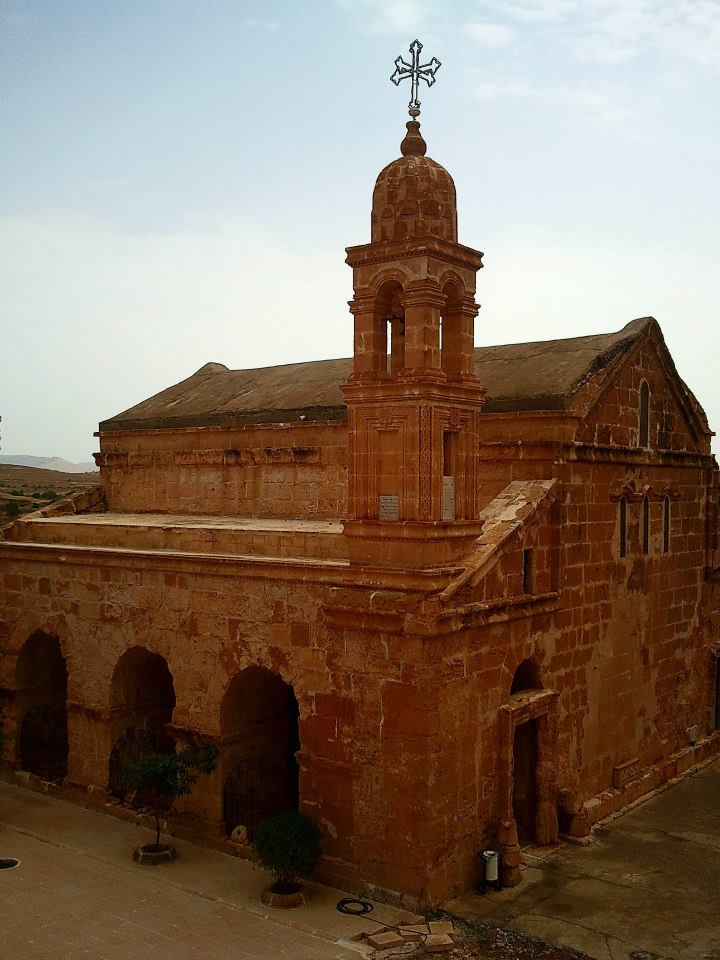

Religion
- Affiliation: Syriac Orthodox

Location
- Location: Barıştepe, Midyat, Mardin, Turkey
- Interactive map of Mor Yakup Monastery

Architecture
- Established: 6th century

Mor Yakup Monastery is a Syriac Orthodox monastery located in the Midyat district of Mardin province, Turkey. Situated in the Syriac-inhabited village of Barıştepe, it was built in the 6th century and dedicated to Mor Yakup, a Christian hermit. It underwent restoration in the 8th century. In 2021, it was added to the UNESCO World Heritage Tentative List as part of the Late Antique and Medieval Churches and Monasteries of Midyat and Surrounding Area (Tur ʿAbdin).

== Architecture ==
Mor Yakup Monastery has a five-sided apse, which is rare in Byzantine monasteries. It has a transverse nave plan. The apse opening is not just a rectangle, but like an archivolt. There are frescoes of those who donated for the repairs in the 8th century in the monastery.
