= Izala =

Izala may refer to:

- Mount Izla, a low mountain ridge in southeastern Turkey, that was once the location of dozens of Christian monasteries
- Izala Society, a Nigerian Wahhabi/Salafi organization created to fight Sufism
