= Mor Quryaqos Church =

Church in Midyat District, Turkey

Coordinates: 37°27′23″N 41°27′34″E

- Mor Kuryakos Kilisesi

Religion
- Affiliation: Syriac Orthodox

Location
- Location: Bağlarbaşı, Midyat, Mardin, Turkey
- Interactive map of Mor Quryaqos Church

Architecture
- Established: 8th century

Mor Quryaqos Church is a Syriac Orthodox church located in the Midyat district of Mardin province, Turkey. Situated in the Syriac-inhabited village of Bağlarbaşı, it was built in the 8th century and dedicated to Mor Quryaqos. In 2021, it was added to the UNESCO World Heritage Tentative List as part of the Late Antique and Medieval Churches and Monasteries of Midyat and Surrounding Area (Tur ʿAbdin). Following a restoration, the church has reopened for worship in 2026 after a fifty-year break.

== Architecture ==
Mor Quryaqos Church was built as a hall-type church. It has large apse archivolts. The church has open-air oratories (beth slutho), which are typical of the region.
