= Life of Gabriel of Qartmin =

Life of Gabriel of Qartmin is a Syriac 8th-century biography of Gabriel of Beth Qustan, Bishop of Tur Abdin, which provides a glimpse into the Middle East of the 7th century.

The quote below provides an example of the Dhimmi agreements of Christians during the Arab conquests.

This lord Gabriel went to the ruler (ahid shultana) of the sons of Hagar, who was Umar bar Khattab, in the city of Gezirta. He (Umar) received him with great joy, and after a few days the blessed man petitioned this ruler and received his signature to the statutes and laws, orders and prohibitions, judgements and precepts pertaining to the Christians, to churches and monasteries, and to priests and deacons that they do not give the poll tax, and to monks that they be freed from any tax (madatta). Also that the wooden gong should not be banned and that they might chant hymns before the bier when it comes out from the house to be buried, together with many [other] customs. This governor (shallita) was pleased at the coming to him of the blessed man and this holy one returned to the monastery with great joy. (Gabriel of Qartmin, Life XII, 72 [p. 123])

Robert Hoyland argues that, as the use of the wooden gong and chanting before a bier did not become common place until the eighth century, this account must be of a later composition, and belongs to that genre of documents, which sought to defend Christian communities against their Muslim overlords by fabricating authoritative Muslim-Christian treaties and attributing them to famous Muslim figures.
