= Günyurdu, Nusaybin =

Village in Mardin Province, Turkey

Günyurdu
- Neighbourhood
- Location in Turkey
- Coordinates: 37.139°N 41.454°E
- Country: Turkey
- Province: Mardin
- District: Nusaybin
- Population (2021): 102
- Time zone: UTC+3 (TRT)

Günyurdu (Kurdish: Merbabê; Syriac: Mār Bōbo) (Note: Alternatively transliterated as Mar-bab, Mär Bab, Marbobo, Merbab, Merbap, Mirbab, Morī Bobo, Mōrbōbō, or Mor Bobo. Nisba: Märbābī.) is a village in the municipality and district of Nusaybin, Mardin Province in Turkey. The village is populated by Syriacs and by Kurds of the Mizizex tribe. It had a population of 102 in 2021. It is located in the Raite Forest on the slopes of Mount Izla.

In the village, there is a Syriac Orthodox church of Mār Bōbo and Mar Aho.

== History ==
Mār Bōbo (today called Günyurdu) was historically inhabited by adherents of the Church of the East. The Church of Mār Bōbo was constructed in either the 6th century or the 7th century. The church was likely adopted by Syriac Orthodox Christians in the 18th century. It has been suggested that the village's population may have converted to the Syriac Orthodox Church or the village was abandoned and resettled by Syriac Orthodox Christians. The monk Barṣawmō of Arbo is attested at Mār Bōbo in 1870. In the Syriac Orthodox patriarchal register of dues of 1870, it was recorded that the village had 32 households, who paid 143 dues, and did not have a priest.

The Syriac Catholic bishop Gabriel Tappouni recorded that Mār Bōbo was inhabited by 300 Syriacs in 50 families and was served by two priests in 1913. In 1914, there were 400 Syriacs, as per the list presented to the Paris Peace Conference by the Assyro-Chaldean delegation. They adhered to the Syriac Orthodox Church. It was owned by Sarohan, chief of a subsection of the Haverkan tribe. Amidst the Sayfo, Syriac refugees from the village of Tel-Aryawon were granted refuge at Mār Bōbo by Sarohan, who subsequently escorted the Syriacs from both villages to Beth-Debe, where they survived the genocide.

There were 410 Turoyo-speaking Christians in 57 families at Mār Bōbo in 1966. The Church of Mar Aho was built in 1975, incorporating the Church of Mar Bobo. The village had a school by 1981. In 1995, the village's population of 150 families was forcibly evicted by the Turkish Armed Forces as part of the Kurdish–Turkish conflict and many emigrated abroad to Germany or Switzerland. Mār Bōbo lay abandoned until it was resettled and rebuilt by eight returning Syriac families in 2003.

== Demography ==
The following is a list of the number of Syriac families that have inhabited Mār Bōbo per year stated. Unless otherwise stated, all figures are from the list provided in The Syrian Orthodox Christians in the Late Ottoman Period and Beyond: Crisis then Revival, as noted in the bibliography below. (Note: The size of a single family varies between five and ten persons.)

- 1966: 57
- 1978: 67
- 1979: 38
- 1981: 28
- 1995: 0
- 2013: 12–13

== Bibliography ==
- Al-Jeloo, Nicholas (2015). "Transferrable Religious Heritage: Church Buildings in Northern Mesopotamia". Le patrimoine architectural de l’Église orthodoxe d’Antioche: Perspectives comparatives avec les autres groupes religieux du Moyen-Orient et des régions limitrophes. Publications of the University of Balamand. pp. 111–127.
- Bcheiry, Iskandar (2009). The Syriac Orthodox Patriarchal Register of Dues of 1870: An Unpublished Historical Document from the Late Ottoman Period. Gorgias Press.
- Bcheiry, Iskandar (2010). Collection of Historical Documents in Relation with the Syriac Orthodox Community in the Late Period of the Ottoman Empire: The Register of Mardin MS 1006. Gorgias Press.
- Brock, Sebastian (2021). "The Syrian Orthodox Church in the twentieth century". Eastern Christianity, Theological Reflection on Religion, Culture, and Politics in the Holy Land and Christian Encounter with Islam and the Muslim World (PDF). Living Stones of the Holy Land Trust. pp. 155–181.
- Courtois, Sébastien de (2004). The Forgotten Genocide: Eastern Christians, The Last Arameans. Translated by Vincent Aurora. Gorgias Press.
- Courtois, Sébastien de (2013). "Tur Abdin : Réflexions sur l'état présent descommunautés syriaques du Sud-Est de la Turquie,mémoire, exils, retours". Cahier du Gremmamo (in French). 21: 113–150.
- Dinno, Khalid S. (2017). The Syrian Orthodox Christians in the Late Ottoman Period and Beyond: Crisis then Revival. Gorgias Press.
- Gaunt, David (2006). Massacres, Resistance, Protectors: Muslim-Christian Relations in Eastern Anatolia during World War I. Gorgias Press.
- Jongerden, Joost; Verheij, Jelle, eds. (2012). Social Relations in Ottoman Diyarbekir, 1870-1915. Brill.
- Keser-Kayaalp, Elif, ed. (January 2022). Syriac Architectural Heritage at Risk in TurʿAbdin (PDF).
- Palmer, Andrew (1990). Monk and Mason on the Tigris Frontier: The Early History of Tur Abdin. Cambridge University Press.
- Ritter, Hellmut (1967). Turoyo: Die Volkssprache der Syrischen Christen des Tur 'Abdin (in German). Vol. 1. Franz Steiner Verlag.
- Tan, Altan (2018). Turabidin'den Berriye'ye. Aşiretler - Dinler - Diller - Kültürler (in Turkish). Pak Ajans Yayincilik Turizm Ve Diş Ticaret Limited şirketi. ISBN 9789944360944.
