= Dağiçi, Nusaybin =

Village in Mardin Province, Turkey

Dağiçi
- Neighbourhood
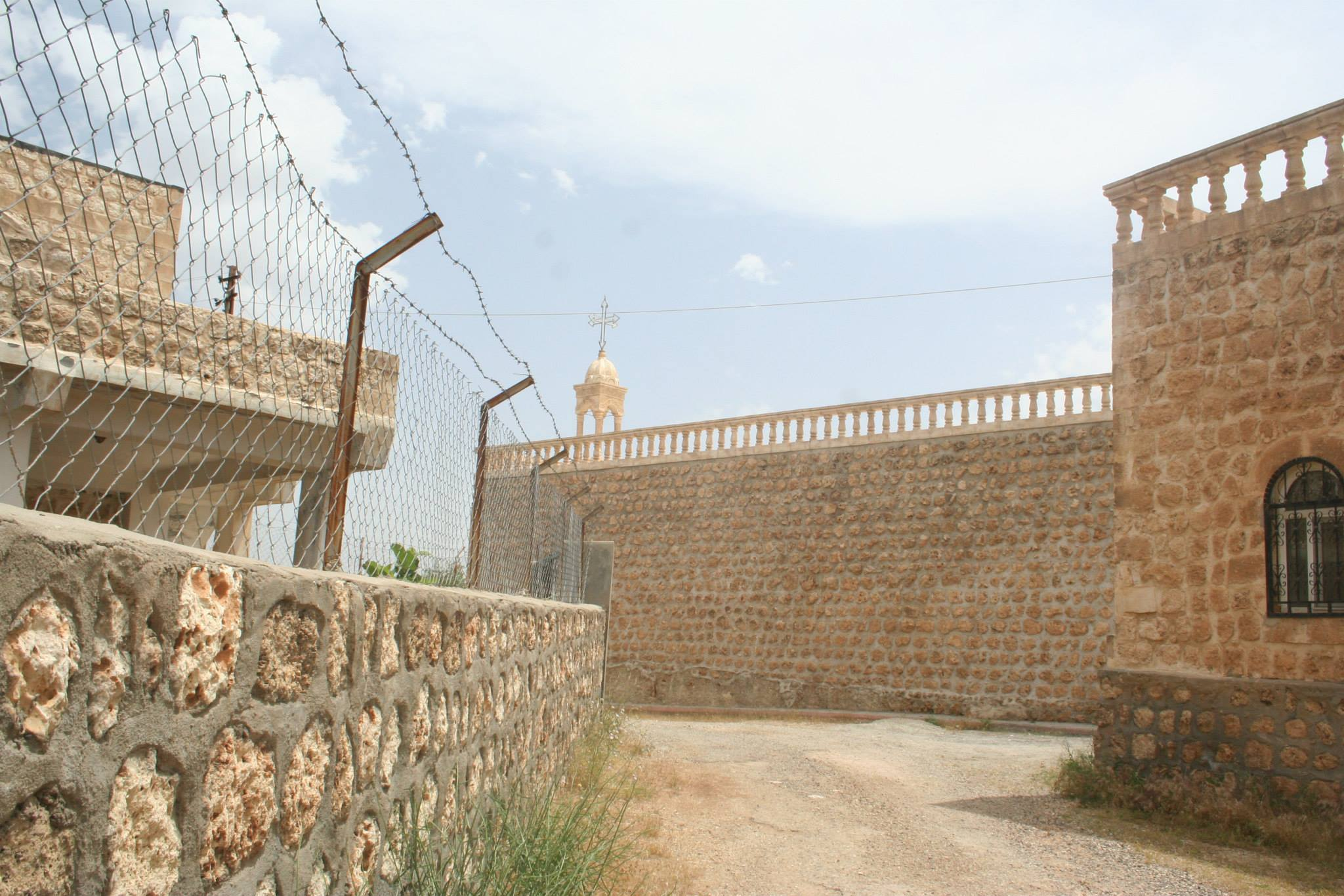
- Syriac Orthodox church in the village

- Location within Turkey
- Coordinates: 37.207°N 41.398°E
- Country: Turkey
- Province: Mardin
- District: Nusaybin
- Population (2021): 34
- Time zone: UTC+3 (TRT)

Dağiçi (Kurdish: Harabmişki, lit. 'rat ruins'; (Note: Also spelt as Xerabê Mişka.) Syriac: Xarābe Mişkâ) (Note: Alternatively transliterated as Chrabe Mishka, Ḫarābī Miškī, Harbo d'misko, Harbtho, Harbtho D’meşko, Harabmishka, Harabemişke, Harab-Mechké, Haraba-Mechké, Harapmeşk, Harap-Mişki, Harapmişki, Kharab-Meshka, or Kharabe-Mishka. Nisba: Xarabmişkī.) is a neighbourhood in the municipality and district of Nusaybin, Mardin Province in Turkey. The village is populated by Syriacs and had a population of 34 in 2021. It is located atop Mount Izla.

== History ==
In the Syriac Orthodox patriarchal register of dues of 1870, it was recorded that Xarābe Mişkâ (today called Dağiçi) had 7 households, who paid 4 dues, and it did not have a priest. There was a church of Yūldaṯ Alohō. In 1914, it was inhabited by 200 Syriacs, according to the list presented to the Paris Peace Conference by the Assyro-Chaldean delegation. They belonged to the Syriac Orthodox Church. Amidst the Sayfo, the villagers took refuge at the Mor Malke Monastery. The village had a population of 345 in 1960. There were 394 Turoyo-speaking Christians in 58 families in 1966. A graveyard for PKK militants was constructed in 1997.

== Demography ==
The following is a list of the number of Syriac families that have inhabited Xarābe Mişkâ per year stated. Unless otherwise stated, all figures are from the list provided in The Syrian Orthodox Christians in the Late Ottoman Period and Beyond: Crisis then Revival, as noted in the bibliography below.

- 1915: 10/20 (Note: Courtois notes 10 families in 1915, whereas Dinno gives 20 families.)
- 1966: 58
- 1978: 40
- 1979: 36
- 1987: 10

== Bibliography ==
- Atto, Naures (2011). Hostages in the Homeland, Orphans in the Diaspora: Identity Discourses Among the Assyrian/Syriac Elites in the European Diaspora (PDF). Leiden University Press.
- Bcheiry, Iskandar (2009). The Syriac Orthodox Patriarchal Register of Dues of 1870: An Unpublished Historical Document from the Late Ottoman Period. Gorgias Press.
- Biner, Zerrin Özlem (2020). States of Dispossession: Violence and Precarious Coexistence in Southeast Turkey. University of Pennsylvania Press.
- Courtois, Sébastien de (2004). The Forgotten Genocide: Eastern Christians, The Last Arameans. Translated by Vincent Aurora. Gorgias Press.
- Dinno, Khalid S. (2017). The Syrian Orthodox Christians in the Late Ottoman Period and Beyond: Crisis then Revival. Gorgias Press.
- Gaunt, David (2006). Massacres, Resistance, Protectors: Muslim-Christian Relations in Eastern Anatolia during World War I. Gorgias Press.
- Günaysu, Ayşe (2019). Safety Of The Life Of Nun Verde Gökmen In The Village Zaz (Izbirak) — Midyat, Tur Abdin – And The General Social Situation Of The Assyrian Villages In The Region (PDF). Translated by Abdulmesih BarAbraham. Human Rights Association Commission Against Racism and Discrimination.
- Jongerden, Joost; Verheij, Jelle, eds. (2012). Social Relations in Ottoman Diyarbekir, 1870-1915. Brill.
- Oberkampf, Horst (2012). "Almost a Miracle – Syriacs are Returning to their Homelands". In Pieter Omtzigt; Markus K. Tozman; Andrea Tyndall (eds.). The Slow Disappearance of the Syriacs from Turkey and of the Grounds of the Mor Gabriel Monastery (PDF). LIT Verlag Münster. pp. 121–138.
- Ritter, Hellmut (1967). Turoyo: Die Volkssprache der Syrischen Christen des Tur 'Abdin (in German). Vol. 1. Franz Steiner Verlag.
- Tan, Altan (2018). Turabidin'den Berriye'ye. Aşiretler - Dinler - Diller - Kültürler (in Turkish). Pak Ajans Yayincilik Turizm Ve Diş Ticaret Limited şirketi. ISBN 9789944360944.
