= Barıştepe, Midyat =

Village in Mardin Province, Turkey

Barıştepe
- Neighbourhood
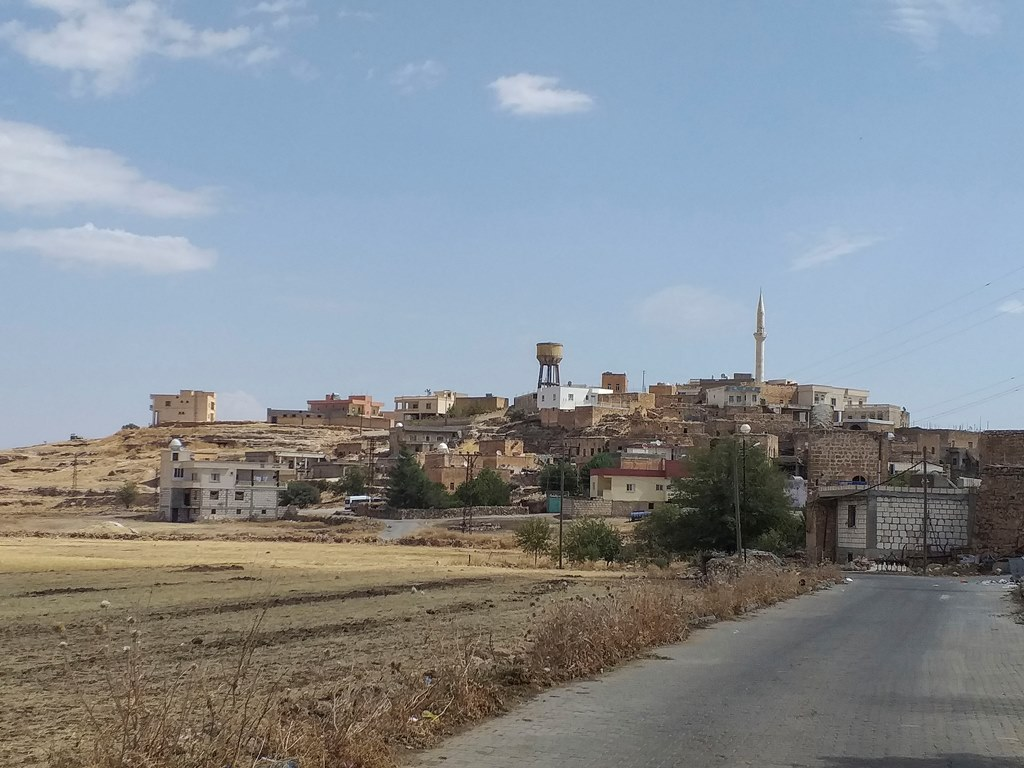

- Location within Turkey
- Coordinates: 37.482°N 41.402°E
- Country: Turkey
- Province: Mardin
- District: Midyat
- Population (2021): 1,026
- Time zone: UTC+3 (TRT)

Barıştepe (Arabic: صلح; Kurdish: Salhê; (Note: Also spelt as Salhi or Selhe.) Syriac: ܨܠܚ, romanized: Salaḥ) (Note: Alternatively transliterated as Salah, Salâh, Saleh, Ṣalḥe, Ṣāliḥ, Ṣaliḥ, Salih, or Saliha. Nisba: Ṡalḥōyo.) is a neighbourhood in the municipality and district of Midyat, Mardin Province in Turkey. The village is populated by Syriacs and by Kurds of the Arnas tribe and had a population of 1,026 in 2021. It is located in the historic region of Tur Abdin.

== History ==
Salaḥ (today called Barıştepe) is attested in the Life of Mar Ya‘qub (d. 421) by the name of Shilloḥ. (Note: In medieval manuscript notes, the village is known as Salaḥ.) The Monastery of Morī Ya‘qūb at Salaḥ was established in the fifth century. The Syriac writer Daniel of Salaḥ flourished in c. 540. In 587, during the Roman–Sasanian War of 572–591, the Roman general Philippicus defeated the Sasanian Empire near the village and deported local people who had hidden in caves. Iyawannis Theodorus Shuqayr, son of deacon Abu al-Faraj of Salaḥ, was metropolitan of Edessa in 1204–1222. Basilius Barsoum of Salaḥ, metropolitan of Hah, was ordained by Patriarch Ignatius bar Wahib (d. 1333). Basilius Yeshu’ Jallo of Salaḥ, metropolitan of Zarjal in 1442–1455, was ordained by Patriarch Hanukh of Tur Abdin.

In 1454 (AG 1765), a large number of men from the village were suffocated to death by smoke by Turks of the clan of Hasan Beg, as per the account of the priest Addai of Basibrina in c. 1500 appended to the Chronography of Bar Hebraeus. Iyawannis Abd al-Masih of Salaḥ was metropolitan of Miyafarqat in 1460–1469/1477. Timothy Abd Yeshu’ II of Salaḥ was metropolitan of Amid (fl. 1678 – c. 1679/1686). The village was attacked in 1693 and the monastery was plundered by Rustem Bey. Gregorius Simon II of Salaḥ was metropolitan of Jerusalem in 1693–1718. In 1720, the Monastery of Morī Ya‘qūb was abandoned and occupied by Kurds. Metropolitan Morī Fīlūksīnūs Zaytūn of Anḥil reclaimed the Monastery of Morī Ya‘qūb in 1851 and installed a monk there. In the Syriac Orthodox patriarchal register of dues of 1870, it was recorded that the village had 20 households, who paid 39 dues, and did not have a priest.

In 1914, it was populated by 100 Syriacs, as per the list presented to the Paris Peace Conference by the Assyro-Chaldean delegation. They adhered to the Syriac Orthodox Church. The agha of the village was Hassano. There were 80 Muslim homes. Amidst the Sayfo, on 2 or 3 July 1915, the village was surrounded and attacked by soldiers and Kurdish clans on the orders of the governor of Midyat and the Christians were slaughtered in their own homes. Empty houses in the village were subsequently settled by Muslim refugees who had been displaced by the war. Only a few people who had not been at the village on the day of the massacre and a few women who were kept by the troops survived the slaughter. Syriacs who attempted to return to the village were met with violence. The Monastery of Morī Ya‘qūb was abandoned during the First World War.

The population was 935 in 1960. There were 230 Turoyo-speaking Christians in 28 families in 1966.

== Ecclesiastical history ==
The diocese of Salaḥ is first mentioned at the end of the thirteenth century and was seated at the Monastery of Morī Ya‘qūb the Recluse at Salaḥ. Dioscorus Musa of Salah, from the Monastery of Mar Ibrahim, was bishop in 1285–1292. Dioscorus Musa of Salaḥ was ordained as metropolitan of Salaḥ in 1330. Barsauma was bishop in 1332. Habib, metropolitan of Salaḥ in 1495–1504/1508, was ordained by Patriarch Masʿūd II of Ṭur ʿAbdin.

From 1571/1572 to 1584, the patriarchate of Tur Abdin was united with the patriarch of Antioch and thus several bishops were appointed for Salaḥ. Theodosius was metropolitan of Salaḥ in 1579/1580. In 1581, Severus was metropolitan of Salaḥ. Iliyya, metropolitan of Salaḥ, was ordained by Patriarch Ignatius David II Shah in 1582/1583. Iwanis was bishop of Salaḥ in 1684–1687. Cyril John al-Kul was bishop of Salaḥ in 1766–1769. Athanasius Joseph Karrum of Mardin was bishop of Salaḥ from 1847 until his death in 1852.

== Demography ==
The following is a list of the number of Syriac families that have inhabited Ṣalaḥ per year stated. Unless otherwise stated, all figures are from the list provided in The Syrian Orthodox Christians in the Late Ottoman Period and Beyond: Crisis then Revival, as noted in the bibliography below.

- 1915: 40 (Note: Dinno notes 28 families in 1915 whereas Courtois gives 30 or 40 families.)
- 1966: 28
- 1978: 15
- 1979: 14
- 1981: 15
- 1987: 8
- 1995: 1

== Bibliography ==
- Barsoum, Aphrem (2008). The History of Tur Abdin. Translated by Matti Moosa. Gorgias Press.
- Bcheiry, Iskandar (2009). The Syriac Orthodox Patriarchal Register of Dues of 1870: An Unpublished Historical Document from the Late Ottoman Period. Gorgias Press.
- Bcheiry, Iskandar (2013). The Account of the Syriac Orthodox Patriarch Yūḥanun Bar Šay Allāh (1483–1492): The Syriac Manuscript of Cambridge: DD.3.8(1). Gorgias Press.
- Bell, Gertrude (1982). The Churches and Monasteries of the Ṭur ʻAbdin. Pindar Press.
- Biner, Zerrin Özlem (2020). States of Dispossession: Violence and Precarious Coexistence in Southeast Turkey. University of Pennsylvania Press.
- Courtois, Sébastien de (2004). The Forgotten Genocide: Eastern Christians, The Last Arameans. Translated by Vincent Aurora. Gorgias Press.
- Dinno, Khalid S. (2017). The Syrian Orthodox Christians in the Late Ottoman Period and Beyond: Crisis then Revival. Gorgias Press.
- Fiey, Jean Maurice (1993). Pour un Oriens Christianus Novus: Répertoire des diocèses syriaques orientaux et occidentaux (in French).
- Gaunt, David (2006). Massacres, Resistance, Protectors: Muslim-Christian Relations in Eastern Anatolia during World War I. Gorgias Press.
- Jongerden, Joost; Verheij, Jelle (2012). Social Relations in Ottoman Diyarbekir, 1870–1915. Brill. ISBN 978-90-04-22518-3. Archived from the original on 18 October 2023.
- Kiraz, George A. (2011). "Niʿmatullāh, Ignatius". In Sebastian P. Brock; Aaron M. Butts; George A. Kiraz; Lucas Van Rompay (eds.). Gorgias Encyclopedic Dictionary of the Syriac Heritage. Gorgias Press. p. 308.
- Ritter, Hellmut (1967). Turoyo: Die Volkssprache der Syrischen Christen des Tur 'Abdin (in German). Vol. 1. Franz Steiner Verlag.
- Tan, Altan (2018). Turabidin'den Berriye'ye. Aşiretler - Dinler - Diller - Kültürler (in Turkish). ISBN 9789944360944.
- Yeşilmen, Halit (2017). Mahallemiler ve ebruli kültürün ağırbaşlılığı: değişim, kimlik, din (PDF) (in Turkish). Çizgi Kitabevi.
