= Governor of Mardin =

Governor of a Turkish Province

Governor of Mardin Mardin Valiliği
- Logo of the Governor of Mardin
- Incumbent; Tuncak Akkoyun since 18 August 2023
- Appointer: President of Turkey; On the recommendation of the Turkish government
- Term length: No set term length or limit
- Inaugural holder: Mehmet Şükrü Yaşin
- Website: Office of the Governor

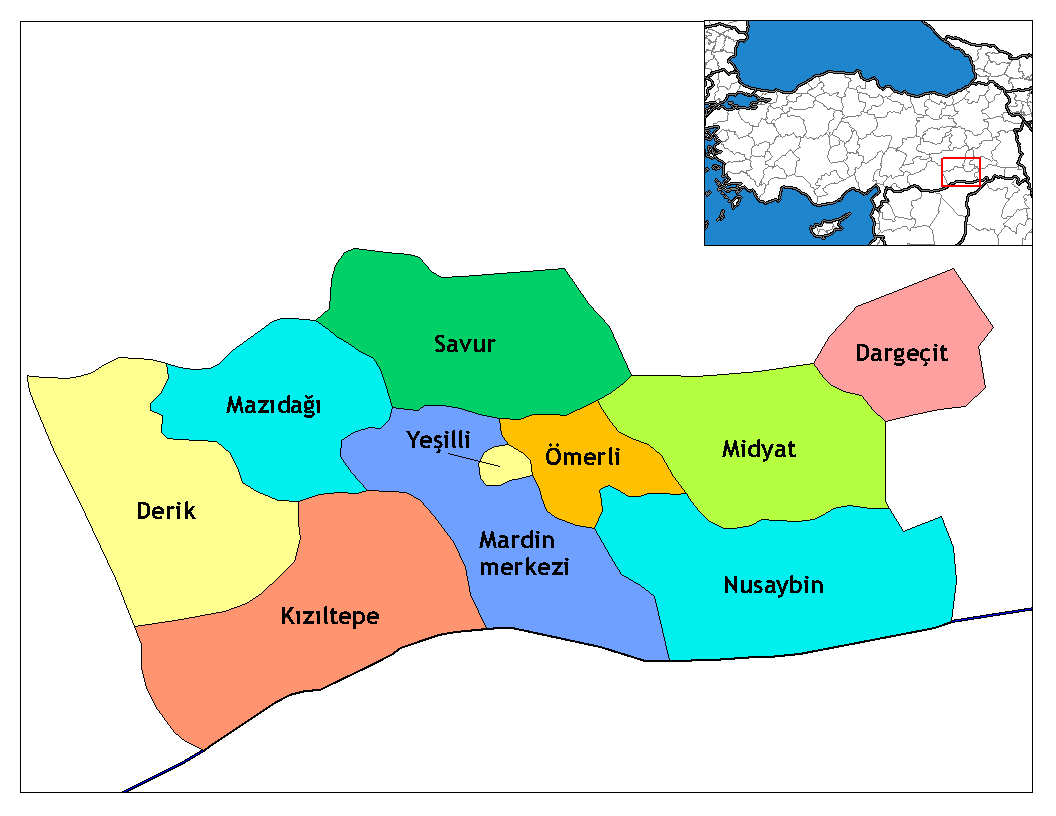
Map of the Province of Mardin, showing the provincial districts.

Governor of Mardin (Turkish: Mardin Valiliği) is the Civil service official responsible for both national government and state affairs in the Province of Mardin. Similar to the Governors of the 80 other Provinces of Turkey, the Governor of Mardin is appointed by the Government of Turkey and is responsible for the implementation of government legislation within Mardin. The Governor is also the most senior commander of both the Mardin provincial police force and the Mardin Gendarmerie. The current Governor of Mardin is Mahmut Demirtaş.

== Appointment ==
The Governor of Mardin is appointed by the President of Turkey, who confirms the appointment after recommendation from the Turkish Government. The Ministry of the Interior first considers and puts forward possible candidates for approval by the cabinet. The Governor of Mardin is therefore not a directly elected position and instead functions as the most senior civil servant in the Province of Mardin.

=== Term limits ===
The Governor is not limited by any term limits and does not serve for a set length of time. Instead, the Governor serves at the pleasure of the Government, which can appoint or reposition the Governor whenever it sees fit. Such decisions are again made by the cabinet of Turkey. The Governor of Mardin, as a civil servant, may not have any close connections or prior experience in Mardin Province. It is not unusual for Governors to alternate between several different Provinces during their bureaucratic career.

== Functions ==
The Governor of Mardin has both bureaucratic functions and influence over local government. The main role of the Governor is to oversee the implementation of decisions by government ministries, constitutional requirements and legislation passed by Grand National Assembly within the provincial borders. The Governor also has the power to reassign, remove or appoint officials a certain number of public offices and has the right to alter the role of certain public institutions if they see fit. Governors are also the most senior public official within the Province, meaning that they preside over any public ceremonies or provincial celebrations being held due to a national holiday. As the commander of the provincial police and Gendarmerie forces, the Governor can also take decisions designed to limit civil disobedience and preserve public order. Although mayors of municipalities and councillors are elected during local elections, the Governor has the right to re-organise or to inspect the proceedings of local government despite being an unelected position.

== List of governors of Mardin ==
- Ali Rıza Ceylan (1923–1924)
- Hasan Faiz Ergun (1924–1925)
- İbrahim Etem Aykut (1925–1927)
- Fuat Tuksal (1927–1929)
- Nazmi Toker (1929–1932)
- Zeynel Abidin Özmen (1932–1933)
- Talat Öncel (1933–1935)
- Ahmet Cevdet Ertuğrul (1935–1939)
- Refik Noyan (1939–1941)
- Eşref Erkut (1941–1944)
- Burhanettin Teker (1944–1945)
- Ziya Kasnakoğlu (1945–1946)
- Recai Türeli (1946–1947)
- Kamil Tuncel (1947–1949)
- Ahmet Demir (1949–1950)
- Fevzi Karakülah (1950–1951)
- Atıf Ulusoğlu (1951–1952)
- Mustafa Rauf İnan (1952–1953)
- Haluk Nihat Pepeyi (1953–1954)
- Mesut Çehreli (1954–1955)
- Eşref Ayhan (1955–1956)
- Ekrem Özsoy (1956–1960)
- Nadir Sünter (1960–1961)
- Sait Kemalî Atay (1961–1964)
- Ahmet Vefik Kitapçıgil (1964–1966)
- Ali Rıza Yaradanakul (1966–1968)
- Nezih Okuş (1968–1970)
- Mustafa Kemal Demirtaş (1970–1971)
- Sabahattin Çakmakoğlu (1971–1975)
- Fikret Turgut Sayın (1975–1978)
- Yılmaz Ergun (1978–1979)
- Kenan Güven (1979–1980)
- Hasan Bamyacı (1980–1984)
- Yalçın Küçük (1984–1988)
- Aykut Ozan (1988–1992)
- İsmet Metin (1992–1993)
- Ahmet Rıfat Kaplan (1993–1996)
- Lütfullah Bilgin (1996–2000)
- Temel Koçaklar (2000–2003)
- M. Fahri Aykurt (2003–2006)
- Mehmet Kılıçlar (2006–2008)
- Hasan Duruer (2008–2011)
- Turhan Ayvaz (2011–2013)
- Ahmet Cengiz (2013–2014)
- Mustafa Taşkesen (2014–2015)
- Ömer Faruk Koçak (2015–2016)
- Mustafa Yaman (2016–2020)
- Mahmut Demirtaş (2020–2023)
- Tuncay Akkoyun (2023–)

== See also ==
- Governor (Turkey)
- Mardin Province
- Ministry of the Interior (Turkey)
