= Güzelsu, Nusaybin =

Village in Mardin Province, Turkey

Güzelsu
- Settlement
- Location in Turkey
- Coordinates: 37.23803°N 41.46194°E
- Country: Turkey
- Province: Mardin
- District: Nusaybin
- Time zone: UTC+3 (TRT)

Güzelsu (Arabic: حباب; Kurdish: Habab; (Note: Also spelt as Habap.) Syriac: ܚܒܒ, romanized: Ḥbob) (Note: Alternatively transliterated as Ḥabāb, Hbab, Ḥbāb, Hbob, Hebob, Ḥvōv, or Hvov. Also known as Ehwo, Iḥwo, Ihwo, or Uhwo. Nisba: Iḥwōyo.) is a settlement in the municipality and district of Nusaybin, Mardin Province in Turkey. It is populated by Syriacs. It is located atop Mount Izla in the historic region of Tur Abdin. The village is known for its viticulture.

== History ==
Ḥbob (today called Güzelsu) was historically inhabited by Syriac Orthodox Christians. The Church of Mor Sergis and Mor Bakos at Ḥbob was probably constructed in the late 7th-century AD. The village was destroyed alongside Nisibis, Arbo, and Ma’are by Malik al-Adel, the governor of Hasankeyf, in 1403 (AG 1714). Rabban Saliba of Ḥbob, Rabban Yuhanna of Ḥbob, the priest Addai of Ḥbob, and Rabban Behnam of Ḥbob are recorded amongst the monks residing at the Mar Malke Monastery in 1476. Iyawannis, son of deacon Iliyya of Ḥbob, bishop of the Monastery of Mar Malke in 1560–1579, was ordained by Patriarch Ignatius Ni'matallah.

Severus Malke of Ḥbob, metropolitan of the Monastery of Mar Malke in 1582–1599, was ordained by Patriarch Ignatius David II Shah. Severus Ephraim of Ḥbob, metropolitan of the Monastery of Mar Malke before 1674–1684, was ordained by Patriarch Habib of Tur Abdin. Severus Hanukh (Enoch), son of Yeshu’ of Ḥbob, was metropolitan of the Monastery of Mar Malke in 1681–1709/1718. Sawera Yuhanna Jannan, bishop of the Monastery of Mar Malke and Ḥbob in 1783–1825, was ordained by Patriarch Barsoum of Tur Abdin. (Note: The bishops of the Monastery of Mar Malke sometimes added Ḥbob to their title.) At this time, Ignatius Yunan resided at the Mor Eliyo Monastery at Ḥbob. The village had 8 priests and 1 monk in 1784.

Ḥbob was devastated by cholera in 1801. Until the 19th-century, Ḥbob was a large and a wealthy village. The village is said to have had 1000 Syriac Orthodox families. Ḥbob was an administrative centre at times. Ignatius Barsoum of Ḥbob was an illegitimate patriarch of Tur Abdin in 1816–1839. Cyril Denha, son of Gabriel of Ḥbob, was bishop of the Mor Mattai Monastery from 1858 until his death in 1871. In the Syriac Orthodox patriarchal register of dues of 1870, it was recorded that the village had 10 households, who paid 19 dues, and was served by the Church of Morī Sarkīs, Baḫūs, and Yūldaṯ Alohō, the Monastery of Morī Eliyyō, and one priest. The village had 8 priests in 1875. Cyril Yuhanna Hakim of Ḥbob was metropolitan of Nisibin in 1881–1901. In 1914, the village was inhabited by 300 Syriacs, as per the list presented to the Paris Peace Conference by the Assyro-Chaldean delegation.

Amidst the Sayfo, upon hearing of the massacres, the villagers collected provisions and moved into the churches whilst refugees from other villages and Midyat took refuge in the Mor Eliyo Monastery. Musa Asso of Midyat was elected to lead the village's defence. In early August 1915, Ḥbob was surrounded and attacked by Kurds of the Omariyan, Bunusra, Elyan, and Apshe tribes and some Yazidis from the villages of Mhuka, Dasekha, and Bajenne. The fighting went on for 15 days and resulted in the death of 4 Syriac men, but the attack was unsuccessful. One of the Kurdish leaders, Hassan Hajo, was captured alongside some of his men by the Syriacs. After the captives were released, the Kurds lifted their siege of Ḥbob.

The village was used as a stronghold by Kurdish rebels in 1924–1928. The Monastery of Mor Eliyo was completely destroyed during the suppression of the rebellion. The Church of Mor Sergis and Mor Bakos was restored after the Second World War. In 1966, there were 130 Turoyo-speaking Christians in 18 families at Ḥbob. By 1999, the village had been abandoned by the Christians and was inaccessible. In 2022, the Turkish Ministry of Culture and Tourism declared the Church of Mor Serkis and Mor Bakus as immovable cultural assets. The village was declared a special security zone from 4 August to 18 August 2023.

== Demography ==
The following is a list of the number of Syriac families that have inhabited Ḥbob per year stated. Unless otherwise stated, all figures are from the list provided in The Syrian Orthodox Christians in the Late Ottoman Period and Beyond: Crisis then Revival, as noted in the bibliography below.

- 1915: 40/50 (Note: Dinno and Courtois give 40 families in 1915 whereas Gaunt notes 50 families.)
- 1966: 18
- 1978: 20
- 1979: 16
- 1981: 12
- 1987: 2

== Bibliography ==
- Abed Mshiho Neman of Qarabash (2021) [1918]. Sayfo – An Account of the Assyrian Genocide. Translated by Michael Abdalla; Łukasz Kiczko. Edinburgh University Press.
- Barsoum, Aphrem (2003). The Scattered Pearls: A History of Syriac Literature and Sciences. Translated by Matti Moosa (2nd ed.). Gorgias Press.
- Barsoum, Aphrem (2008). The History of Tur Abdin. Translated by Matti Moosa. Gorgias Press.
- Bcheiry, Iskandar (2009). The Syriac Orthodox Patriarchal Register of Dues of 1870: An Unpublished Historical Document from the Late Ottoman Period. Gorgias Press.
- Biner, Zerrin Özlem (2020). States of Dispossession: Violence and Precarious Coexistence in Southeast Turkey. University of Pennsylvania Press.
- Courtois, Sébastien de (2004). The Forgotten Genocide: Eastern Christians, The Last Arameans. Translated by Vincent Aurora. Gorgias Press.
- Dinno, Khalid S. (2017). The Syrian Orthodox Christians in the Late Ottoman Period and Beyond: Crisis then Revival. Gorgias Press.
- Fiey, Jean Maurice (1993). Pour un Oriens Christianus Novus: Répertoire des diocèses syriaques orientaux et occidentaux (in French).
- Gaunt, David (2006). Massacres, Resistance, Protectors: Muslim-Christian Relations in Eastern Anatolia during World War I. Gorgias Press.
- Günaysu, Ayşe (2019). Safety Of The Life Of Nun Verde Gökmen In The Village Zaz (Izbirak) — Midyat, Tur Abdin – And The General Social Situation Of The Assyrian Villages In The Region (PDF). Translated by Abdulmesih BarAbraham. Human Rights Association Commission Against Racism and Discrimination.
- Hollerweger, Hans; Palmer, Andrew (1999). Turabdin: Living Cultural Heritage (in English, German, and Turkish) (2nd ed.). Friends of Tur Abdin.
- Jongerden, Joost; Verheij, Jelle, eds. (2012). Social Relations in Ottoman Diyarbekir, 1870-1915. Brill.
- Keser-Kayaalp, Elif, ed. (January 2022). Syriac Architectural Heritage at Risk in TurʿAbdin (PDF).
- Palmer, Andrew (1990). Monk and Mason on the Tigris Frontier: The Early History of Tur Abdin. Cambridge University Press.
- Ritter, Hellmut (1967). Turoyo: Die Volkssprache der Syrischen Christen des Tur 'Abdin (in German). Vol. 1. Franz Steiner Verlag.
- Sinclair, T.A. (1989). Eastern Turkey: An Architectural & Archaeological Survey. Vol. III. Pindar Press.
- Tan, Altan (2018). Turabidin'den Berriye'ye. Aşiretler - Dinler - Diller - Kültürler (in Turkish). ISBN 9789944360944.
