= Tur Abdin =

Mountain range in Turkey

Coordinates: 37.35°N 41.40°E

Map of Tur Abdin showing Assyrian villages and monasteries. Extant monasteries are indicated by red crosses; abandoned monasteries, by orange ones.

Tur Abdin (Arabic: طور عبدين; Kurdish: Tor; Latin: Turabdium; Syriac: ܛܽܘܪ ܥܰܒ݂ܕܺܝܢ or ܛܘܼܪ ܥܲܒ݂ܕܝܼܢ, Ṭūr ʿAḇdīn) is a hilly region situated in southeastern Turkey, including the eastern half of Mardin Province, and Şırnak Province west of the Tigris, on the border with Syria and famed since Late Antiquity for its Christian monasteries on the border of the Roman Empire and the Sasanian Empire. The area is a low plateau in the Anti-Taurus Mountains stretching from Mardin in the west to the Tigris in the east and delimited by the Mesopotamian plains to the south. The Tur Abdin is populated by more than 80 villages and nearly 70 monastery buildings and was mostly Syriac Orthodox with a Syriac Catholic minority until the early 20th century. The earliest surviving Christian buildings date from the 6th century.

The name "Tur Abdin" is Syriac: ܛܘܪ ܥܒܕܝܢ, lit. 'Mountain of the Servants [of God]'.‌ Tur Abdin is of great importance to the Syriac Orthodox, for whom the region used to be a monastic and cultural heartland. The Assyrian community of Tur Abdin natively refer to themselves as Sūryāyê/Sūryōyê or Sūrāyê/Sūrōyê (Syriac: ܣܘܪ̈ܝܐ), and traditionally speak a central Neo-Aramaic dialect called Turoyo.

== Geography ==
Tur Abdin is a mountain linked to the mountain of Izla that overlooks Nisibin. The region sharing its name is home to numerous monasteries and cells, as well as around fifty villages, both large and small. Two-thirds of the residents in these villages are Syriac Christians, while the remainder consists of Muslims and Yezidis. The capital of Tur Abdin is Midyat.

=== Settlements ===
The town of Midyat and the villages of Hah, Bequsyone, Dayro da-Slibo, Saleh (with the old monastery of Mor Yaqub), Iwardo (with Mor Huschabo), Anhel, Kafro, Arkah (Harabale, with Dayro Mor Malke), Beth Sbirino, Miden (Middo), Kerburan, Binkelbe with Mor Samun Zayte and Beth Zabday (Azech) were all important Syriac Orthodox settlements among with countless other villages. Hah, today called Anıtlı, has the ancient 'Idto d'Yoldath-Aloho, the Church of the Mother of God. Ignatius Aphrem I mentions the following settlements in his book: to the east of Tur Abdin are Anhil, Fifyath, and Qartmin; to the west are Bati, Habsnas, Salah, 'Urnus, 'Aynward, Kafra, Kafarze, Kafrsalta, Kafrshami, and Kandarib; to the north are Alin, Baqsyan, Hah, Hisn Kifa, Dayr Salib, Zaz, and Karburan; and to the south are Arbo, Badebe, Basibrina, Banim'im, Tamars, Hbob, Sari Awastir, 'Arban, and Meddo. The abandoned villages and those whose locations are unknown include Halih, Zabdiqa, Kafryab, and Kalasht.

== History ==
=== Antiquity ===
Tur Abdin was referred to as the "Land of the Arameans" in the inscriptions of Assur-Bel-Kala, indicating that some territories west and northwest of Assyria were considered to be inhabited by Arameans.

Assyrian king Adad-nirari II, who came to throne in the late 10th century BCE, removed the Arameans from political power in the Kashiari mountains (Tur Abdin). In the 9th century BCE, Ashurnasirpal II described crossing the plateau of Tur Abdin (which he calls "Kashyari") on his way to attack the region of Nairi, more than once. He erected a monument in Matiate, modern-day Midyat in Tur Abdin, which remains to be found. His successor, Shalmaneser III, also crossed Tur Abdin, whom the Arameans later would again rebel against at the end of his term.

Most ancient monuments in Tur Abdin are Christian, but as attested by Ashurnasirpal II, the area has a pre-Christian history. Older names of the area indicate that the people living here worshipped Assyrian deities. Arches on the north side of the churches in Zaz and Saleh suggest pre-Christian buildings originally stood on the sites. Ancient Assyro-Babylonian religion is believed to have survived in the region until as late as the 18th century.

In 586 B.C. the prophet Ezekiel mentions the famed wine of Izlo, on the southern edge of the plateau of Tur Abdin, in his prophecy against Tyre.

The Mor Gabriel Monastery, one of the oldest Syriac Orthodox churches in the world, was founded in 397 by the ascetic Mor Shmu'el (Samuel) and his student Mor Shem'un (Simon). According to tradition, Shem'un had a vision in which an angel commanded him to build a House of Prayer at a location marked by three large stone blocks. When Shem'un awoke, he took his teacher to the site and discovered the stone that the angel had indicated. It was at this spot that Mor Gabriel Monastery was constructed.

In Late Antiquity, the area was part of the Roman Empire's province of Mesopotamia and served as an important center of Roman Christianity, referred to in Latin as Mons Masius or Izla. The region was fortified by Emperor Constantius II (r. 337–361), who built the fortress of Rhabdion to protect it during the Roman–Persian Wars. After the failure of Julian's Persian War in 363, the Tur Abdin became part of the Sasanian Empire along with the remaining territory of the five Transtigritine provinces and the nearby strongholds of Nisibis and Bezabde. The numerous monasteries of the Tur Abdin eventually became part of the Church of the East organized at the Council of Seleucia-Ctesiphon in 410. They mainly took the Miaphysite position of non-Chalcedonian Christianity after the Council of Chalcedon of 451. After a period of persecution by the Chalcedonian state church of the Roman Empire and during the Byzantine–Sasanian War of 602–628, the monasteries of the Tur Abdin enjoyed a particular prosperity under Arab rule in the latter 7th century.

The fortress of Rhabdion was mentioned by the 6th-century Greek historian Procopius, while the 6th-century Notitia Antiochena and the work of the 7th-century Greek geographer George of Cyprus both attest that Turabdium was an episcopal see. The bishop of Turabdium's seat was probably the village of Hah, in which were, besides the functioning 6th-century monastery, several ruined churches including the cathedral. Tur Abdin became part of the Rashidun Caliphate in 640, during the Muslim conquest of the Levant. The Syriac Orthodox communities flourished under early Islamic rule; nearly 30 structures are known to have been wholly built or rebuilt in the following 150 years, during which most of the villages' churches were built.

After the Council of Chalcedon in 451 AD, a schism occurred between the two claimants of the See of Antioch: the Miaphysites (formally established as the Syriac Orthodox Church) and the Chalcedonians (formally established as the Greek Orthodox Church). The latter had the full support of imperial power, which then caused the Miaphysites to be "severely persecuted as heretical Monophysites [sic] by the Byzantine Emperors" according to William Dalrymple, which led the Syriac Orthodox Church hierarchy to retreat to the "inaccessible shelter of the barren hills of the Tur Abdin."

=== Modern ===
Before World War I, the Syriac Christian population of the Ottoman Empire has been estimated at around 619,000. Figures from the Armenian Patriarchate of Constantinople indicate that more than one fifth lived in the Armenian vilayets: about 60,000 in Diyarbakır, 25,000 in Sebastia, 18,000 in Van, 15,000 in Bitlis, and 5,000 in Kharberd. Midyat, in Diyarbekir vilayet, was the only major town in the Ottoman Empire with an Assyrian majority, although this population was divided among Syriac Orthodox, Chaldean Catholics, and Protestants. Syriac Orthodox Christians were concentrated in the hilly rural areas around Midyat, where they populated almost 100 villages and worked in agriculture or crafts. Syriac Orthodox culture was centered in two monasteries near Mardin (west of Tur Abdin): Mor Gabriel and Deyrulzafaran. Outside of the area of core Syriac settlement, there were also sizable populations in the towns of Diyarbakır, Urfa, Harput, and Adiyaman as well as villages. Unlike the Assyrian population of Tur Abdin, many of these Assyrians spoke other languages besides Syriac.

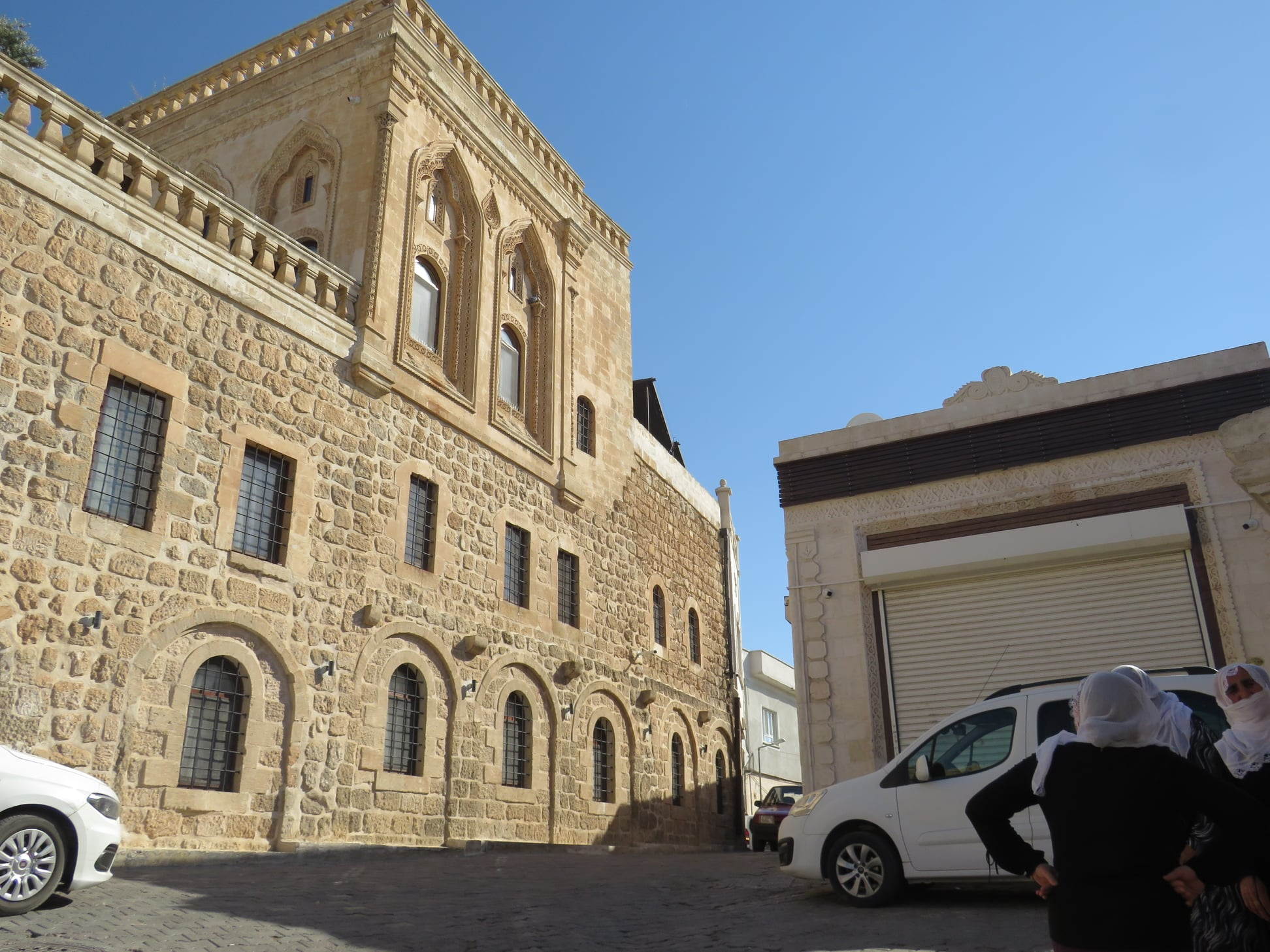
View of the Syriac Christian quarter in Midyat

During World War I, around 300,000 Assyrian Christians were killed in the genocide perpetrated by the Ottoman Empire, known in Syriac as Sayfo, meaning 'the sword.' In the last few decades, caught between Turkish assimilation policies against Kurds and Kurdish resistance, many Assyrians have fled the region or been killed. Today, only about 5,000 Assyrians remain, which is a quarter of the Christian population from thirty years ago. Most have fled to Syria (where the city of Qamishli was established by them), Iraq (where significant Syriac Orthodox communities had existed in Mosul, Bartella, and Bashiqa), Europe (particularly Sweden, Germany, France, the United Kingdom and the Netherlands), Australia and the United States. In the past few years, a few families have returned to Tur Abdin from the diaspora.

Due to migration, the Syriacs' main residential area in Turkey today is Istanbul, where around 20,000 lives there.

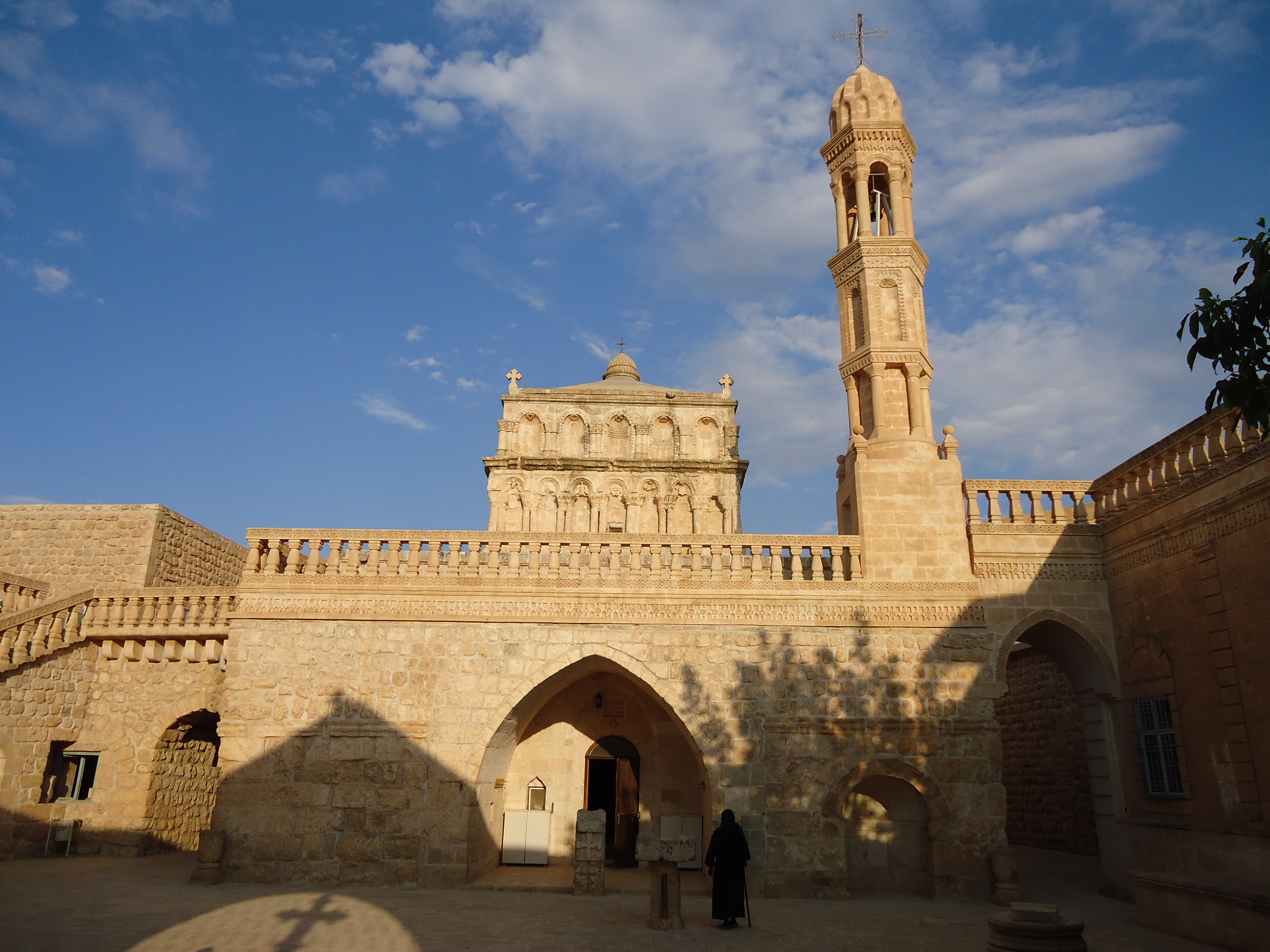
Yoldath Aloho (Mother of God) Syriac Orthodox church in Midyat

As of 2019, an estimated between 2,000 and 3,000 of the country's 25,000 Assyrians live in Tur Abdin, and they are spread among 30 villages, hamlets, and towns. Some of these locations are dominated by Assyrians while others are dominated by the Kurds. As part of a return movement, some Syriac Orthodox Christians returned to Tur Abdin villages from Germany, Sweden and Switzerland. Some have also relocated to Tur Abdin from Syria and other parts of Turkey, due to the Islamic State and Kurdish–Turkish conflict, respectively.

The late patriarch of the Syriac Orthodox Church, Ignatius Aphrem I Barsoum, authored a detailed work on the history of Tur Abdin up to his time, titled Maktbonuto d-ʿal ʾatro d-Ṭur ʿabdin, with a posthumously-published Arabic translation by Boulos Behnam (1963) and an English translation entitled History of Tur Abdin by Matti Moosa (2009). Due to his ecclesiastical position, Barsoum had great opportunities to gather significant and previously little-known information for these biographies from various Syriac prayer books, lectionaries, liturgical texts, and gospels in various churches throughout the East, particularly in Tur Abdin. He also discovered manuscripts that were unknown to other Orientalists, who had to rely on those available in Western libraries.

Historians of Eastern Christianity have often overlooked Tur Abdin. In this region, Syriac liturgy is still celebrated in ancient churches by a community of Syriac Christian monks and villagers. Although the Syriac Orthodox and Syriac Catholic populations have been severely reduced through migration, outside interest in the area's culture has grown in recent years. With improved accessibility and the greater political stability of southeastern Turkey, the region has also become an increasingly popular destination for tourists.

=== Christian resistance in Tur Abdin during WW1 ===
The Assyrians of Diyarbekir Vilayet made significant resistance. Their strongest stand was at the villages of Azakh, Iwardo, and Basibrin. For months, Kurdish tribes and Turkish soldiers commanded by Ömer Naci Bey were unable to subdue the mostly Syriac Orthodox and Syriac Catholic villagers who were joined by Armenian and other refugees from surrounding villages. The leaders of the Azakh fedayeen swore

"We all have to die sometime; do not die in shame and humiliation."

and lived up to their fighting words.

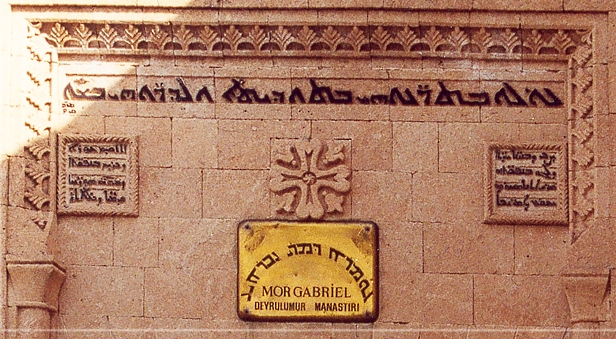
Portal of Mor Gabriel Monastery

=== Recent conflicts ===
On 10 February 2006 and the following day, large demonstrations took place in the city of Midyat in Tur Abdin. Muslims, enraged by the Jyllands-Posten Muhammad cartoons, gathered in Estel, the new part of the city, and started marching towards the old part of Midyat (6 kilometers away), where the Assyrians live. The mob was stopped by the police before reaching old Midyat.

In 2008 a series of legal challenges were made against the monastery of Mor Gabriel. Some local Kurdish villages sought to claim land on which the monastery had paid taxes since the 1930s as belonging to the villages, and made other accusations against the monastery. This led to considerable diplomatic and human rights action throughout Europe and within Turkey.

== Monasteries ==
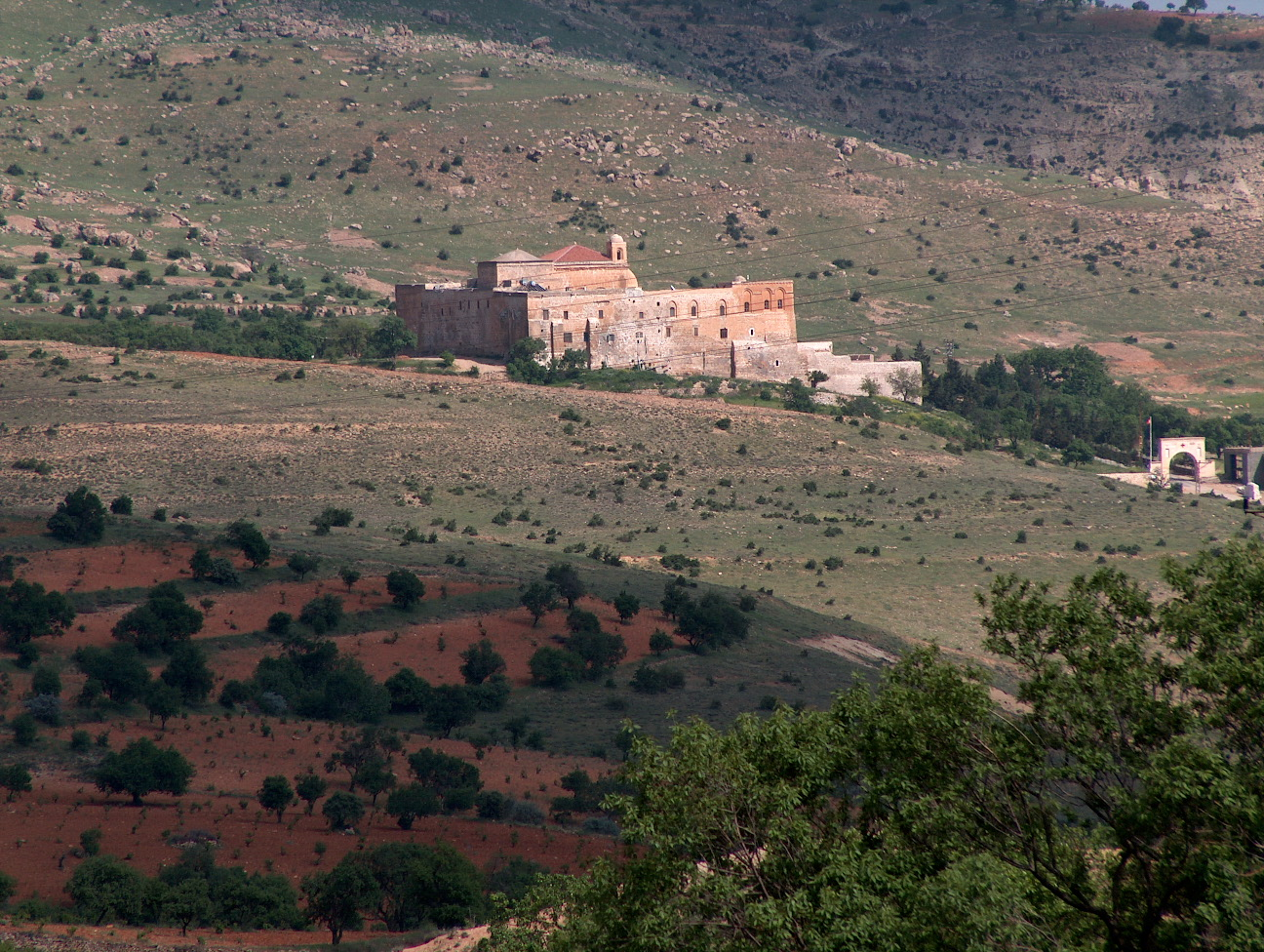
Mor Hananyo Monastery, or The Saffron Monastery in English

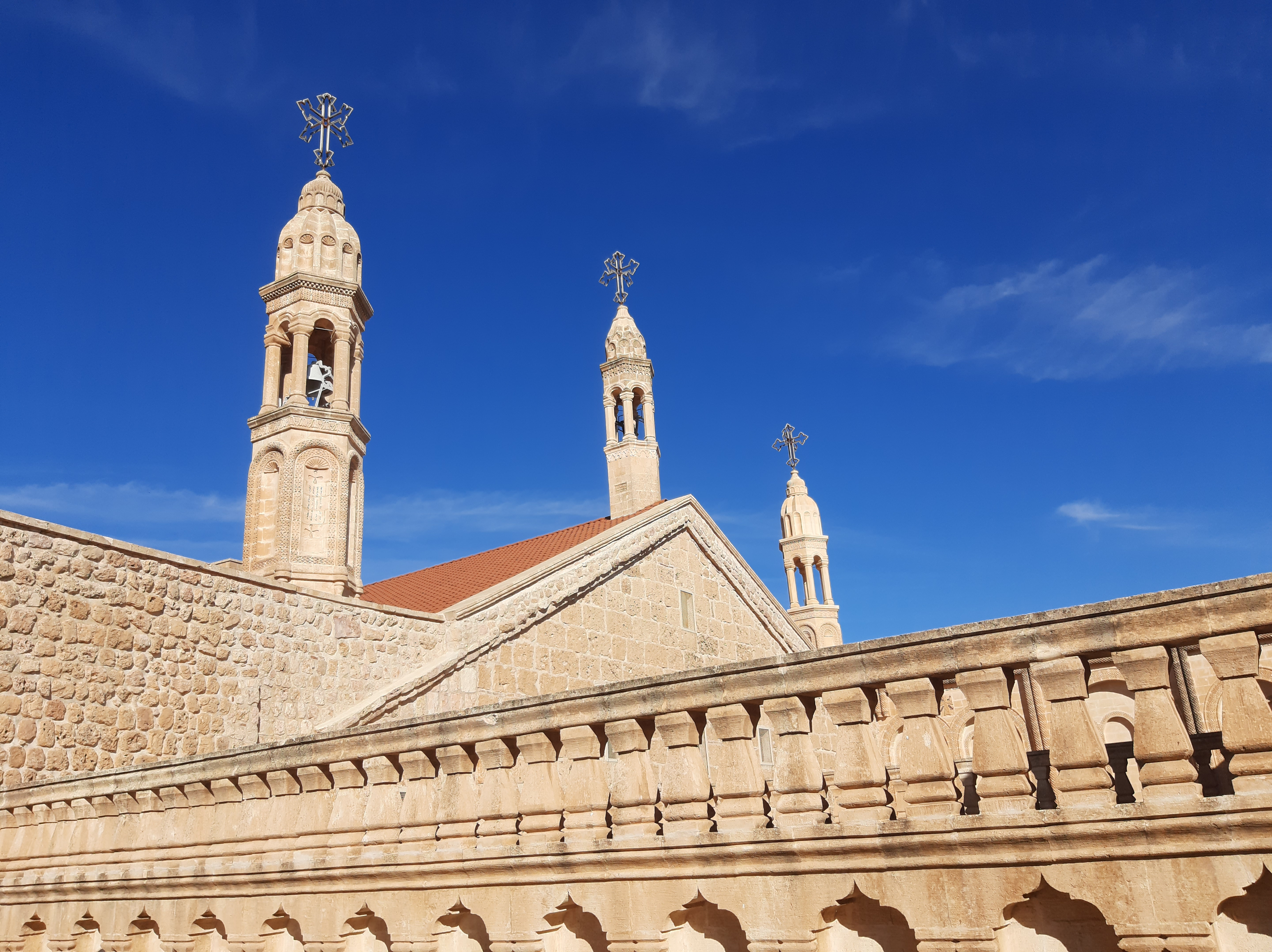
Mor Gabriel Monastery

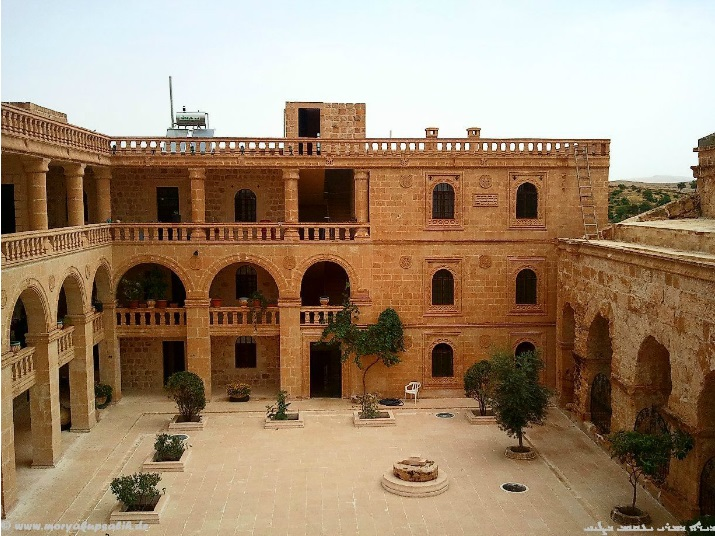
Mor Yakup Monastery in Saleh, Tur Abdin

The most important Syriac Orthodox center in Tur Abdin is the monastery of Dayro d-Mor Hananyo, located 6 km southeast of Mardin, in the western part of the region. Constructed from yellow rock, the monastery is affectionately known as Dayro d Kurkmo in Syriac, Dayr al-Zafaran in Arabic, and Deyrülzafarân in Turkish, translating to the "Saffron Monastery". Founded in 493 AD, it served as the residence of the Syriac Orthodox Patriarch from 1160 until 1932. Although the patriarch now resides in Damascus, the monastery still houses the patriarchal throne and the tombs of seven patriarchs and metropolitans.

Today, the monastery is overseen by a bishop, a monk, and several lay assistants, and it functions as a school for orphans. The bishop of Mor Hananyo also serves as the patriarchal vicar of Mardin, with a mission to rebuild the monastery and preserve the history of the Syriac Orthodox Church. The monastery of Saint Ananias is recognized as part of the UNESCO World Cultural Heritage and has been visited by numerous notable figures, including the UK's King Charles III during his time as Prince of Wales.

In the centre of the Tur Abdin region, a few miles south of Midyat, is Dayro d-Mor Gabriel. Built in 397 AD, Mor Gabriel monastery is the second-oldest functioning Syriac Orthodox monastery in the world, behind Mor Mattai Monastery. It is currently the residence of the Metropolitan Bishop of Tur Abdin, seven nuns, four monks and a host of guests, assistants and students. The monastery is charged with keeping the flame of Syriac Orthodox faith alive in Tur Abdin, for which it is as much a fortress as a church.

The Saffron and Mor Gabriel monasteries are the most important of the region, existing along with six or seven other active monasteries:

- The Mor Augin Monastery, situated on the southern slope of Mt. Izla, has recently undergone revival. It holds significant historical importance for the region. A testament to this is the fact that a Syriac Orthodox bishop in the Netherlands, Polycarpus Augin Aydin, chose the name Augin in honor of the monastery's founder, Mar Awgin.
- The Mor Abroham Monastery is located less than a mile east of Midyat and is known for its extensive farmland, some of which has been donated to house Syrian refugees. Directly adjacent to the monastery is the Turabdin Hotel and winery, which utilizes the monastery's vineyards to produce unique Syriac wines that are characteristic of the region.
- The Meryemana (St. Mary) Monastery, located next to the village of Anıtlı, functions as the religious center for the remaining Christians of the village, and has a school for the local children.
- The Monastery of St. Jacob the Recluse (Dayro d’Mor Ya’qub Hbishoyo) is situated next to the village of Baristepe and, like the St. Mary Monastery, serves as the religious center for the remaining Christians in the village. It was first mentioned in the tenth century and functioned as the seat of an anti-Patriarchate in opposition to the Patriarchate established in the Saffron Monastery from 1364 to 1839. The monastery was abandoned after the events of the Seyfo genocide of World War I but has been reoccupied by Christians since 1965.
- A second Mor Yakup Monastery is located in the village of Dibek (Syriac: Badibe), having been rebuilt and occupied in 2013.
- The Mor Malke Monastery is located on the northern slope of Mount Izla and is a few miles south of the village of Üçköy; it is connected by road to the village. Mor Malke is one of the newer monasteries of the region in terms of architecture, as it was rebuilt in the 30s. The monastery has a school, a church, and some farmlands.
- The Mor Aho Monastery was abandoned during the 1900s, but was later turned into a small walled village, when two dozen or so Syriac villagers built houses in the courtyard of the Monastery because its high walls allowed for better security and defense than what their nearby village provided. The monastery has one nun, but as it has no monks or consistent liturgy held in its church, it is technically not a monastery.

The remains of several other monasteries can be found in the region, including the Mor Loʿozor Monastery. However, these sites are uninhabited and largely neglected, primarily due to the decline of the Christian population in the area, as well as the expropriation and seizure of monasteries.

== Notable people ==
- Ibrahim Baylan (b. 1972), Swedish politician of Assyrian descent.
- Shamoun Hanna Haydo (1870–1964), Assyrian leader and folk hero in the early 20th century.
- Nuri Kino, Swedish-Assyrian descent journalist

== Gallery ==
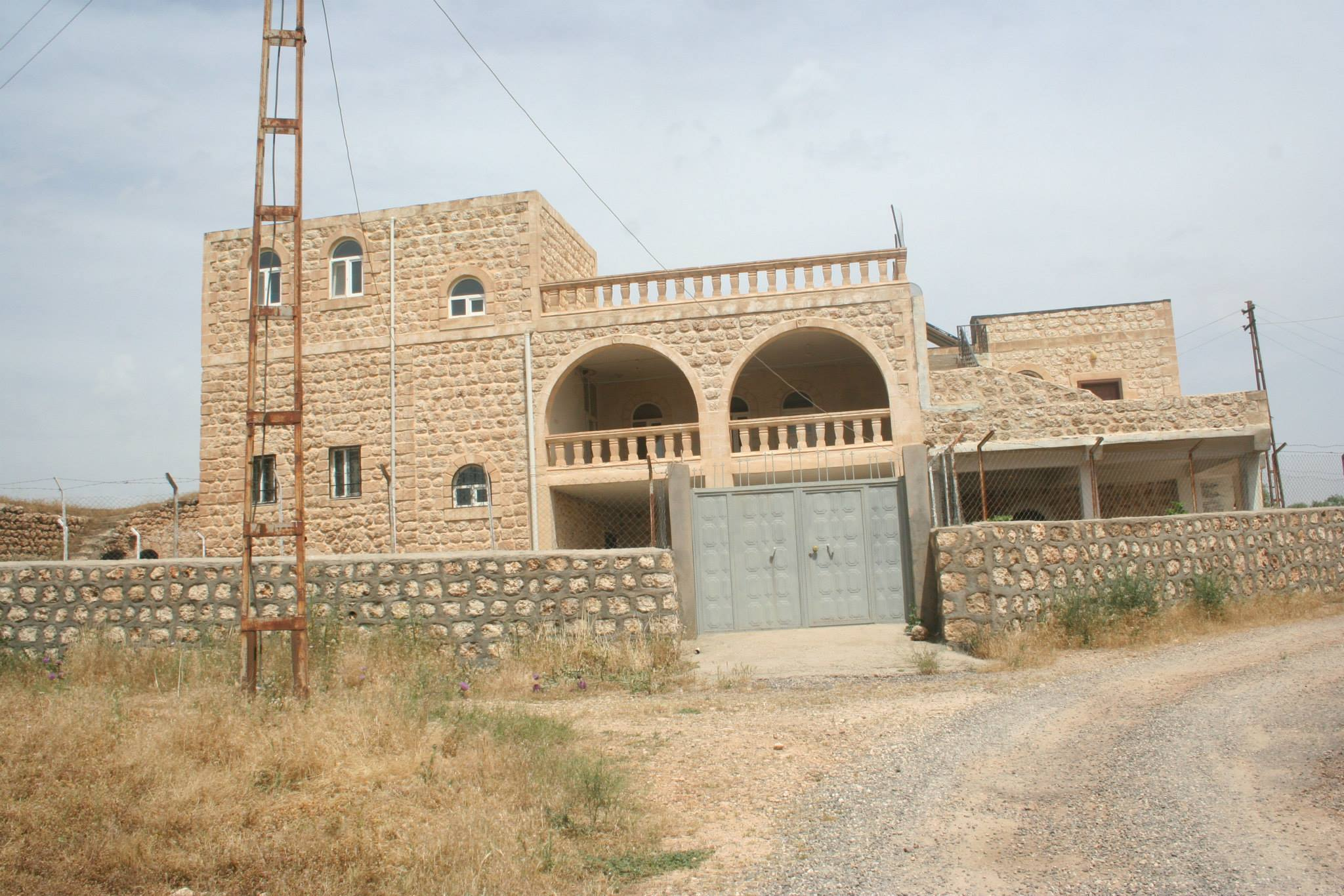

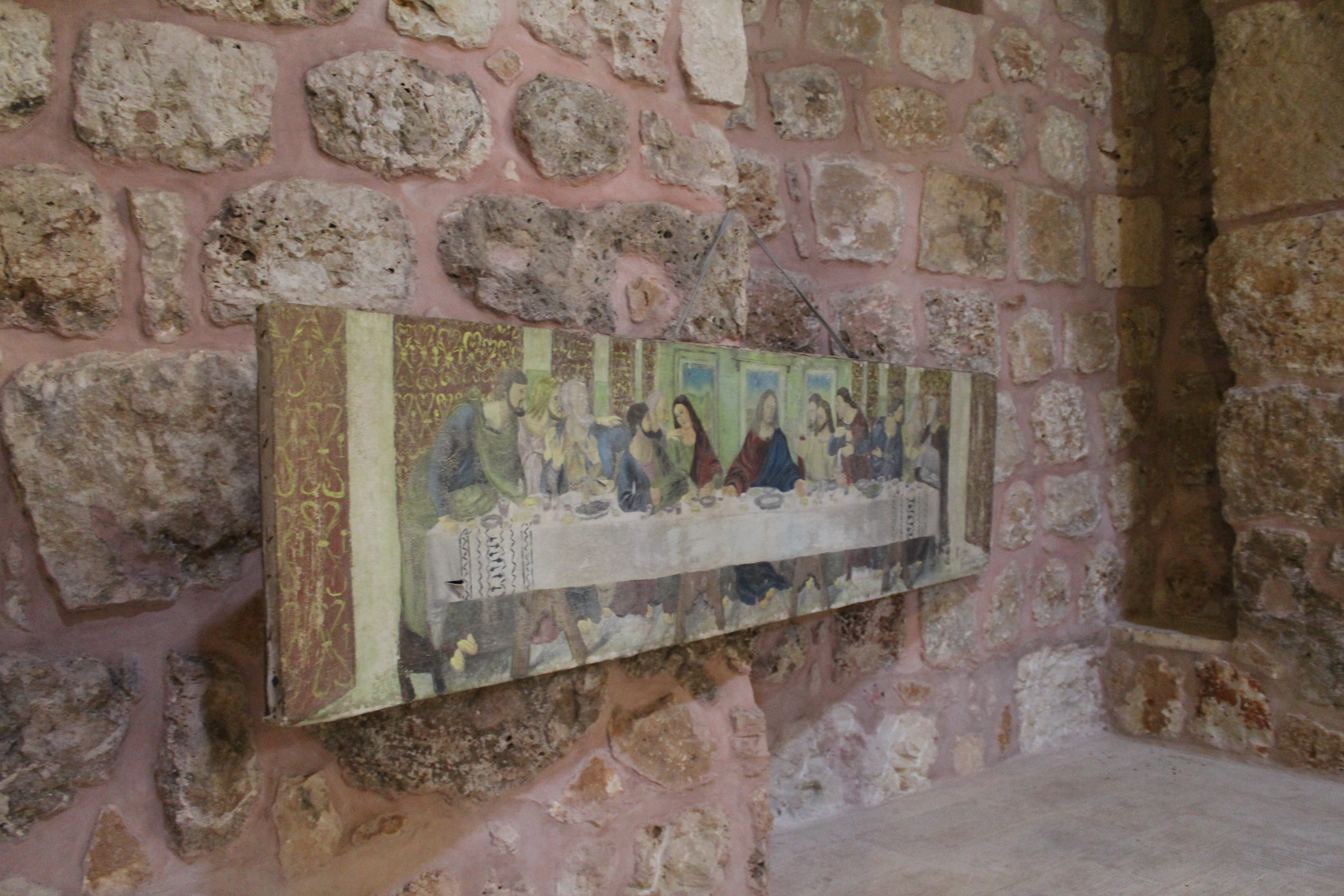

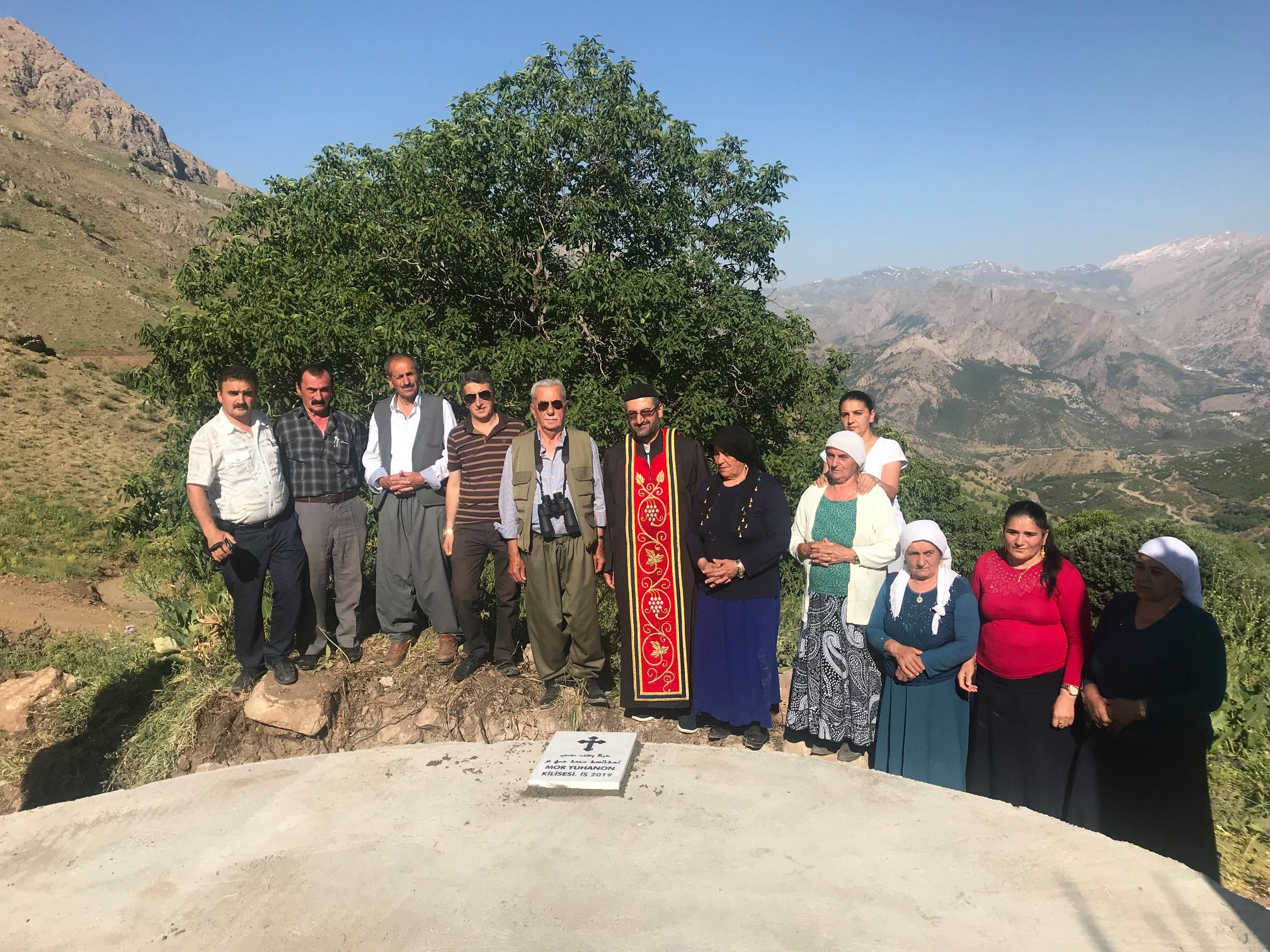

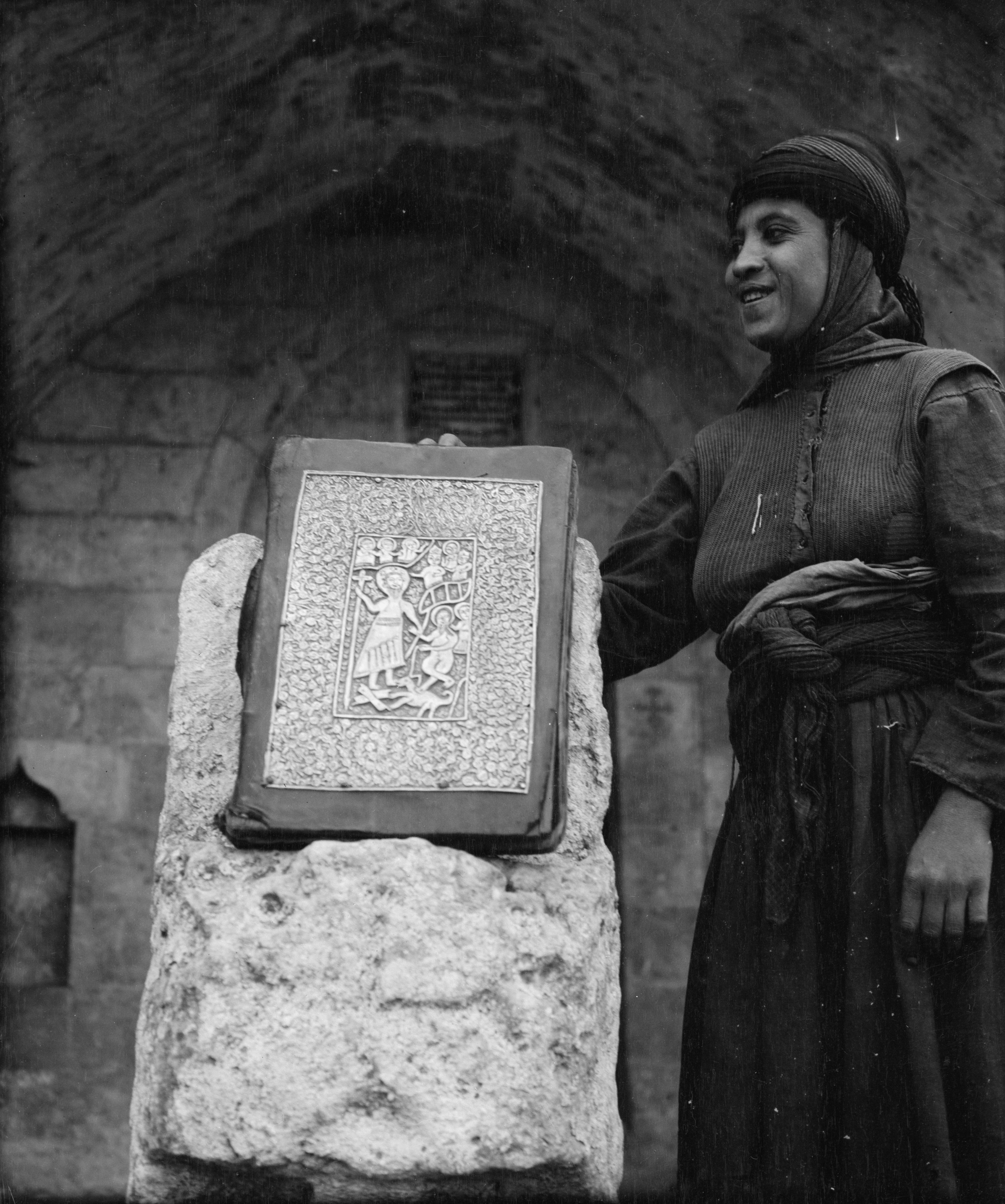

== See also ==
- Hakkari, another historical Syriac Christian region in Turkey
- Patriarchate of Tur Abdin

== Sources ==
- Barsoum, Ignatius Aphram (2008). The History of Tur Abdin. Piscataway, NJ: Gorgias Press. ISBN 9781593337155.
- Bilgic, Zeki (2018). "Aramäisch des Tur Abdin schreiben und lesen: Überlegungen, warum die Sprechergemeinschaft des Tur Abdin das Neu-Aramäische nicht als Schriftsprache anerkennt". Neue Aramäische Studien: Geschichte und Gegenwart. Frankfurt am Main: Peter Lang. pp. 215–250. ISBN 9783631731314.
- Birol, Simon (2018). "Forgotten Witnesses: Remembering and Interpreting the Sayfo in the Manuscripts of Tur 'Abdin". Sayfo 1915: An Anthology of Essays on the Genocide of Assyrians/Arameans during the First World War. Piscataway, NJ: Gorgias Press. pp. 327–346. ISBN 9781463207304.
- Borbone, Pier Giorgio (2017). "From Tur 'Abdin to Rome: The Syro-Orthodox Presence in Sixteenth-Century Rome". Syriac in its Multi-Cultural Context. Leuven: Peeters Publishers. pp. 277–287. ISBN 9789042931640.
- Comfort, Anthony (2017). "Fortresses of the Tur Abdin and the Confrontation between Rome and Persia". Anatolian Studies. 67: 181–229. doi:10.1017/S0066154617000047. JSTOR 26571543. S2CID 164455185.
- DelCogliano, Mark (2006). "Syriac Monasticism in Tur Abdin: A Present-Day Account". Cistercian Studies Quarterly. 41 (3).
- Jastrow, Otto (1993) [1967]. Laut- und Formenlehre des neuaramäischen Dialekts von Mīdin im Ṭūr ʻAbdīn. Wiesbaden: Harrassowitz Verlag. ISBN 9783447027441.
- Gaunt, David (2015). "The Complexity of the Assyrian Genocide". Genocide Studies International. 9 (1): 83–103. doi:10.3138/gsi.9.1.05. ISSN 2291-1847.
- Üngör, Uğur Ümit (2011). The Making of Modern Turkey: Nation and State in Eastern Anatolia, 1913–1950. Oxford University Press. ISBN 978-0-19-965522-9.
- Gaunt, David; Atto, Naures; Barthoma, Soner O. (2017). "Introduction: Contextualizing the Sayfo in the First World War". Let Them Not Return: Sayfo - The Genocide Against the Assyrian, Syriac, and Chaldean Christians in the Ottoman Empire. Berghahn Books. pp. 1–32. ISBN 978-1-78533-499-3.
- Gaunt, David (2020). "The Long Assyrian Genocide". Collective and State Violence in Turkey: The Construction of a National Identity from Empire to Nation-State. Berghahn Books. pp. 56–96. ISBN 978-1-78920-451-3.
- Keser-Kayaalp, Elif (2019). "Church Building in the Ṭur 'Abdin in the First Centuries of the Islamic Rule". Authority and Control in the Countryside: From Antiquity to Islam in the Mediterranean and Near East (Sixt-Tenth Century). Leiden-Boston: Brill. pp. 176–209. ISBN 9789004386549.
- Keser-Kayaalp, Elif, ed. (January 2022). Syriac Architectural Heritage at Risk in TurʿAbdin (PDF). Association for the Protection of Cultural Heritage. ISBN 978-605-06335-9-7.
- Palmer, Andrew (1990). Monk and Mason on the Tigris Frontier: The Early History of Ṭur 'Abdin. Cambridge: Cambridge University Press. ISBN 9780521360265.
- Parpola, Simo (2004). "National and Ethnic Identity in the Neo-Assyrian Empire and Assyrian Identity in Post-Empire Times". Journal of Assyrian Academic Studies. 18 (2): 5–22.
- Prym, Eugen; Socin, Albert (1881). Der neu-aramaeische Dialekt des Ṭûr 'Abdîn. Göttingen: Vandenhoeck & Ruprecht's Verlag.
- Radner, Karen (2006). "How to reach the Upper Tigris: The route through the Tur Abdin". State Archives of Assyria Bulletin. 15: 273–305.
- Saadi, Abdul-Massih (2018). "Interdependence of Classical Syriac and Suryoyo of Tur Abdin (STA): Orthography for the STA". Neue Aramäische Studien: Geschichte und Gegenwart. Frankfurt am Main: Peter Lang. pp. 169–192. ISBN 9783631731314.
- Sommer, Renate (2012). "The Role of Religious Freedom in the Context of the Accession Negotiations between the European Union and Turkey - The Example of the Arameans". The Slow Disappearance of the Syriacs from Turkey and of the Grounds of the Mor Gabriel Monastery. Münster: LIT Verlag. pp. 157–170. ISBN 9783643902689.
- Saouk, Joseph (2015). "Quo vadis Turoyo? A Description of the Situation and the Needs of the Neo-Aramaic of Tur-Abdin (Turkey)". Parole de l'Orient. 40: 361–377.
