= Hellmut Ritter =

German Orientalist specialising in Arabic, Persian, and Turkish

Hellmut Ritter (27 February 1892 – 19 May 1971) was a leading German Orientalist specializing in Arabic, Persian, and Turkish, and an authority on Sufi ritual and mystical beliefs.

== Biography ==
The son of a Protestant minister, his brothers were the conservative historian Gerhard Ritter and the theologist Karl Bernhard Ritter. He was educated at Halle where he studied under Carl Brockelmann and Paul Kahle, then at Strasbourg under Carl Heinrich Becker. He then served as a military interpreter during World War I in Iraq, Palestine and Iran. In 1919 he became a teaching assistant at the University of Hamburg, researching classical Arabic literature and Greek and medieval alchemy. But his academic career in Germany was effectively ended in 1925 when he was convicted for homosexuality. Being dismissed from his post in early 1926, he went to Istanbul.

=== Istanbul (1926-1949) ===
In Istanbul Ritter realised the city's ancient libraries held a wealth of manuscripts and literary treasures that lay moldering and unregarded. He began work on a series of scholarly articles, which he had published in the series Philologika; Issue I - Gustav Flügel's 1870 unfinished translation work on the tenth century encyclopedia of Ibn al-Nadim, entitled Al-Fihrist; Issue VII - edited translations of Arabic and Persian treatises on profane and mystical love; Issue VIII - Anṣāri Haravi and Sanāʾi Ḡaznavi; Issue X - Farid-al-din ʿAṭṭār; Issue XI - Jalāl-al-Din Rumi; Issues XIV-XVI - ʿAṭṭār.

He also discovered the original text of the fantasy anthology Tales of the Marvellous and News of the Strange. Despite his effective exile from Germany, he was head of the German Orientalist Society in Istanbul and his scholarly work had some supporters in Germany. This support enabled the funding of his proposed Bibliotheca Islamica series of scholarly monographs from 1929 onwards. In the early 1930s he worked on early Arabic alchemical manuscripts, among others, and also pioneered the understanding of the influence of Ancient Greek literature on Arabic culture and science. The election of the Nazi Party in Germany in 1933 meant that Ritter's contract for work was ended, but friends in the German Orientalist Society quietly managed to find a small amount of funding that enabled his work to continue. Then a new and local opportunity arose, due to Mustafa Kemal Atatürk's rapid modernisation of Istanbul and Turkey. Thus the newly improved and re-organised Istanbul University asked Ritter to work as a professor. Despite working on a temporary contract, Ritter was tasked with raising a new generation of Turkish scholars, able to work with rigour on the region's ancient literature. The Swiss orientalist Fritz Meier was also among his students in Istanbul. Ritter pursued the work with vigour, making his students learn a new language each year.

=== Germany (1949-1956) ===
After the defeat of the Nazis in World War II Ritter was able to return to Germany in 1949, and this enabled the completion of his most important work: the encyclopaedic manual on the rituals and beliefs of Islamic mysticism Das Meer der Seele (1955 in German). From 1953 he found work as a teaching assistant at the Frankfurt University Institute of Oriental Studies. But homosexuality in Germany was at that time still criminal, and in 1956 he returned again to Istanbul.

=== Istanbul (1956-1969) ===
Upon his return to Turkey Ritter began work at the Istanbul University on a UNESCO-funded project to catalogue the scattered ancient poetry manuscripts in the various city archives. By 1960 Ritter's early sympathies with the mystical orders of Islam and his and assiduous gathering of their MS texts ensured their survival. In the 1920s just prior to Atatürk's official ban of dancing rituals Ritter had recorded the rituals directly from the key dance-masters of Istanbul. The subsequent restoration of these rituals in 1960 relied heavily on Ritter's accurate recordings and interviews for success. Ritter's scholarship, and practice as a musician, helped establish his authority as leader of the field. In his last years he documented a small group of elderly refugees, who were ancient Aramaic native speakers - a language considered endangered - and with whom he prepared a five-volume Aramaic dictionary and guide to the grammar.

=== Germany (1969-1971) ===
Ritter returned to Germany in 1969 and died on May 19, 1971, in Oberursel.

== Publications ==
- "Muslim Mystics Strife with God". Oriens 5.1 (1952): 1–15.
- "Autographs in Turkish Libraries". Oriens 6: 1 (1953): 63–90.
- Das Meer der Seele. Mensch, Welt und Gott in den Geschichten des Farīduddīn ʿAṭṭār (1955); English translation: The Ocean of the Soul: Men, the World and God in the Stories of Farid Al-Din 'Attar (Brill, 2003); Italian translation: Il mare dell'anima. Uomo, mondo e Dio in Feriduddin 'Attar (Ariele, 2004)
