= Beth Kustan, Midyat =

Village in Mardin Province, Turkey

Beth Kustan
- Neighbourhood
- Location within Turkey
- Coordinates: 37.495°N 41.626°E
- Country: Turkey
- Province: Mardin
- District: Midyat
- Population (2022): 154
- Time zone: UTC+3 (TRT)

Beth Kustan (Arabic: باقسيان; Syriac: ܒܝܬ ܩܣܝܢܐ; Turkish: Alagöz; Bethkustan) (Note: Alternatively transliterated as Bagassian, Bagssian, Bakisyan, Bakısyan, Baqesyān, Baqisyan, Baqsyan, Bekusyone, Bekusyono, Bequsyone, Bēt Qusṭan, Bēth Qusṭān, Beth Qusyan, Bōqısyōno, or Boqusyono. Also known simply as Kustan or Qustan. Nisba: Qusnōyo.) is a neighbourhood of the municipality and district of Midyat, Mardin Province in Turkey. It is inhabited by Syriacs who belong to the Syriac Orthodox Church and speak their own dialect of Turoyo, a Central Neo-Aramaic language. (Note: For the use of the term "Syriac" to refer to the population of Beth Kustan. For use of the term "Assyrian". The terms "Syriac" and "Assyrian" are used to refer to the same group of people.) The village had a population of 154 in 2022. It is located in the historic region of Tur Abdin.

In the village, there are churches of Mor Dimet and Mor Eliyo. There are also ruined churches of Mor Shemʿun and Mor Barsaumo. The village is known for its winemaking.

== Etymology ==
The Syriac name of the village is derived from "beth" ("house" in Syriac) and "Kustan" ("Constantine" in Syriac), thus Beth Kustan translates to "house of Constantine".

== History ==
The Church of Mor Eliyo at Beth Kustan was constructed in 343 AD. It has been suggested that the village was founded by a member of the Roman limitanei (frontier militia) named Constans in the 4th century AD. It is believed that the army of the Roman Emperor Constantine the Great (r. 306–337) marched through Beth Kustan on several occasions. The rock of Helen, named after Helena, mother of Constantine I, is located near the village. Philoxenus Yeshu, metropolitan bishop of the Monastery of the Cross and Hah (r. 1368–1410), ordained by Ignatius Saba I, patriarch of Tur Abdin, was from Beth Kustan. Dionysius Yuhanna of Qustan was metropolitan bishop of the Monastery of the Cross in 1519–1543. Cyril Isaiah of Qustan was abbot of the Monastery of Mar Awgin and then metropolitan bishop of Nisibin in 1861–1865.

In the Syriac Orthodox patriarchal register of dues of 1870, it was recorded that the village had fifty-four households, who paid one hundred and eleven dues, and was served by the Church of Morī Eliyyō and one priest. In 1914, the village was inhabited by 500 Syriacs, according to the list presented to the Paris Peace Conference by the Assyro-Chaldean delegation. No Muslims inhabited the village. Upon hearing of the massacres amidst the Sayfo, the villagers decided to take refuge at Hah and were thus escorted there by Hajo, chief of the Kurtak clan. They stayed at Hah for seven years until they were able to return to Beth Kustan with the help of Çelebi Ağa of the Haverkan confederation. The village was destroyed during the Sayfo and took many years to rebuild and resettle.

The village was officially named Alagöz in the 1930s as a result of the state's turkification policy. The Mukhtar of Beth Kustan was killed in suspicious circumstances in the 1960s. The population was 666 in 1966. There were 620 Turoyo-speaking Christians in 155 families at Beth Kustan in 1966. Most of the village's population were forced to leave in the 1960s and 1970s due to the Kurdish–Turkish conflict and emigrated abroad to the Netherlands, Germany, and Switzerland. In 1993, it was alleged that seven villagers were detained and tortured by Turkish paramilitaries. The village was transferred from the district of Dargeçit to Midyat District in 1996. There were less than twenty Syriac families at the village by 2014. On 12 February 2015, Beth Kustan was restored as the official name of the village. The Church of Mor Eliyo was restored by people in the diaspora. In March 2022, the Assyrian Democratic Organization and other organisations sent a letter of protest to the Ministry of Agriculture and Forestry and the Governor of Mardin regarding the encroachment of forest land near Beth Kustan and Derqube.

== Demography ==
=== Families ===
The following is a list of the number of Syriac families that have inhabited Beth Kustan per year stated. Unless otherwise stated, all figures are from the list provided in Eastern Christianity, Theological Reflection on Religion, Culture, and Politics in the Holy Land and Christian Encounter with Islam and the Muslim World, as noted in the bibliography below. (Note: The size of a single family varies between five and ten persons.)

- 1915: 120
- 1966: 155
- 1978: 73
- 1979: 62
- 1981: 63
- 1987: 30
- 1995: 15
- 1997: 17
- 2013: 15–23
- 2017: 20
- 2021: 15

=== Population ===
Historical population

Year	Pop.	±% p.a.
1985	279	—
1990	150	−11.67%
1997	94	−6.46%
2007	115	+2.04%
2012	145	+4.75%
2013	144	−0.69%

Year	Pop.	±% p.a.
2014	145	+0.69%
2015	150	+3.45%
2016	153	+2.00%
2017	164	+7.19%
2018	174	+6.10%
2019	167	−4.02%

Year	Pop.	±% p.a.
2020	162	−2.99%
2021	153	−5.56%
2022	154	+0.65%
2023	159	+3.25%
2024	153	−3.77%

Source: 1985 census, 1990 census, 1997 census and TÜIK (2007-2022), 2013-2024 Data

== Notable people ==
- Gabriel of Beth Qustan (573/574–648), Syriac Orthodox bishop of Tur Abdin
- Timotheos Samuel Aktaş (b. 1945), Syriac Orthodox archbishop of Tur Abdin.

== Bibliography ==
- Barsoum, Aphrem (2003). The Scattered Pearls: A History of Syriac Literature and Sciences. Translated by Matti Moosa (2nd ed.). Gorgias Press.
- Barsoum, Aphrem (2008). The History of Tur Abdin. Translated by Matti Moosa. Gorgias Press.
- Bcheiry, Iskandar (2009). The Syriac Orthodox Patriarchal Register of Dues of 1870: An Unpublished Historical Document from the Late Ottoman Period. Gorgias Press.
- Brock, Sebastian (2021). "The Syrian Orthodox Church in the twentieth century". Eastern Christianity, Theological Reflection on Religion, Culture, and Politics in the Holy Land and Christian Encounter with Islam and the Muslim World (PDF). Living Stones of the Holy Land Trust. pp. 155–181.
- Courtois, Sébastien de (2004). The Forgotten Genocide: Eastern Christians, The Last Arameans. Translated by Vincent Aurora. Gorgias Press.
- Courtois, Sébastien de (2013). "Tur Abdin : Réflexions sur l'état présent descommunautés syriaques du Sud-Est de la Turquie, mémoire, exils, retours". Cahier du Gremmamo (in French). 21: 113–150.
- Gaunt, David (2006). Massacres, Resistance, Protectors: Muslim-Christian Relations in Eastern Anatolia during World War I. Gorgias Press.
- Jongerden, Joost; Verheij, Jelle, eds. (2012). Social Relations in Ottoman Diyarbekir, 1870-1915. Brill.
- Keser-Kayaalp, Elif, ed. (January 2022). Syriac Architectural Heritage at Risk in TurʿAbdin (PDF).
- Lahdo, Ablahad (2014). "Bequsyone Texts Reflecting Cultural Aspects in Tur Abdin". In Tal Davidovich; Ablahad Lahdo; Torkel Lindquist (eds.). From Tur Abdin to Hadramawt: Semitic Studies. Festschrift in Honour of Bo Isaksson on the Occasion of His Retirement. Harrassowitz Verlag. pp. 81–91.
- Oez, Mikael (2018). "A Guide to the Documentation of the Beth Qustan Dialect of the Central Neo-Aramaic Language Turoyo". Language Documentation & Conservation. 12: 339–358.
- Omtzigt, Pieter; Tozman, Markus K.; Tyndall, Andrea, eds. (2012). The Slow Disappearance of the Syriacs from Turkey and of the Grounds of the Mor Gabriel Monastery (PDF). LIT Verlag Münster.
- Palmer, Andrew (1990). Monk and Mason on the Tigris Frontier: The Early History of Tur Abdin. Cambridge University Press.
- Ritter, Hellmut (1967). Turoyo: Die Volkssprache der Syrischen Christen des Tur 'Abdin (in German). Vol. 1. Franz Steiner Verlag.
- Takahashi, Hidemi (2011). "Also via Istanbul to New Haven- Mss. Yale Syriac 7-12". In Felicitas Opwis; David Reisman (eds.). Islamic Philosophy, Science, Culture, and Religion: Studies in Honour of Dimitri Gutas (PDF). Brill. pp. 157–179.
