= Ignatius Saba I =

Syriac Orthodox Patriarch of Tur-Abdin (1364 - 1389)

Ignatius Saba of Salah
- Syriac Orthodox Patriarch of Tur Abdin
- Church: Syriac Orthodox Church
- Installed: 1364
- Term ended: 1389
- Predecessor: Office created
- Successor: Ignatius Yeshu I

Personal details
- Died: 1389

Ignatius Saba I (Syriac: ܐܝܓܢܛܝܘܣ ܣܒܐ), also known as Ignatius Sobo of Salah or Ignatius Sobo Ṣalḥoyo, was the Syriac Orthodox Patriarch of Tur Abdin from 1364 until his death in 1389.

== Biography ==
Butrus (Peter) Saba was the son of the priest Abu al-Hasan, son of Saliba, son of the priest Behnam of the village of Salah. He was the nephew of the bishops Basil Barsoum and Aziz, archbishop of Salah. Saba was consecrated as archbishop of Salah by the Patriarch Ignatius Ismail of Mardin in 1354, upon which he assumed the name Basil.

In 1364, Ismail heard criticism of Saba from a monk named George, and promptly excommunicated Saba without investigation. Saba attempted to speak with Ismail at the patriarchal residence at the monastery of Saint Ananias, but was rebuked and refused entry. After having waited at the gate of the monastery for three days, he left and rallied support for his cause by writing letters to the bishops of Tur Abdin. Saba returned to the patriarchal residence, accompanied by a number of notables and clergymen, including the bishops Yuhanna Yeshu of Qartmin and Philoxenus of Hah, but he was again refused entry and waited outside the monastery for four days.

Saba's supporters resented Ismail's inaction and proclaimed him as patriarch at his residence at the monastery of Saint Jacob at Salah, in opposition to Ismail's patriarchate of Mardin. He received a decree from al-Malik al-Adil Fakhr al-Din Sulayman I al-Ayyubi, Melik of Hasankeyf, thereby confirming his patriarchate within his domain, and Saba was consecrated as Patriarch of Tur Abdin and Hasankeyf on the Feast of the Transfiguration on 6 August in the same year, upon which he assumed the name Ignatius. Saba's ascension as patriarch of Tur Abdin has been noted to reflect the political division between the Artuqid emirate of Mardin and Ayyubid emirate of Hasankeyf. He served as patriarch of Tur Abdin until his death in 1389, and he was buried at the monastery of Saint Jacob at Salah.

== Episcopal succession ==
As patriarch, Saba ordained the following bishops:

1. Malke, archbishop of Midyat, he was killed in 1393 amidst Timur's invasion.
2. Yuhanna Tuma of Basibrina, bishop of Qartmin before 1371–1394.
3. Philoxenus Yeshu of Beth Kustan, bishop of the Monastery of the Cross and Hah in 1368–1410.

== Bibliography ==
- Barsoum, Aphrem (2008). The History of Tur Abdin. Translated by Matti Moosa. Gorgias Press.
- Burleson, Samuel; Van Rompay, Lucas (2011). "List of Patriarchs: II. The Syriac Orthodox Church and its Uniate continuations". In Sebastian P. Brock; Aaron M. Butts; George A. Kiraz; Lucas Van Rompay (eds.). Gorgias Encyclopedic Dictionary of the Syriac Heritage: Electronic Edition. Gorgias Press.
- Carlson, Thomas A. (2019). "Syriac in a Diverse Middle East: From the Mongol Ilkhanate to Ottoman dominance, 1286–1517". In Daniel King (ed.). The Syriac World. Routledge. pp. 718–730.
- Dolabani, Philoxenius Yuhanon (1991). The Flower that Gladdens: A History of the Monastery of Mor Jacob of Salah. Translated by Isa Gulten; Dale A. Johnson. Archived from the original on 2017-04-23.
- Kiraz, George A. (2011). "Sobo, Ignatius". In Sebastian P. Brock; Aaron M. Butts; George A. Kiraz; Lucas Van Rompay (eds.). Gorgias Encyclopedic Dictionary of the Syriac Heritage: Electronic Edition. Gorgias Press.

Preceded by Office created	Syriac Orthodox Patriarch of Tur Abdin; 1364–1389	Succeeded by Ignatius Yeshu I
