= Altıntaş, Midyat =

Village in Mardin Province, Turkey

Altıntaş
- Neighbourhood
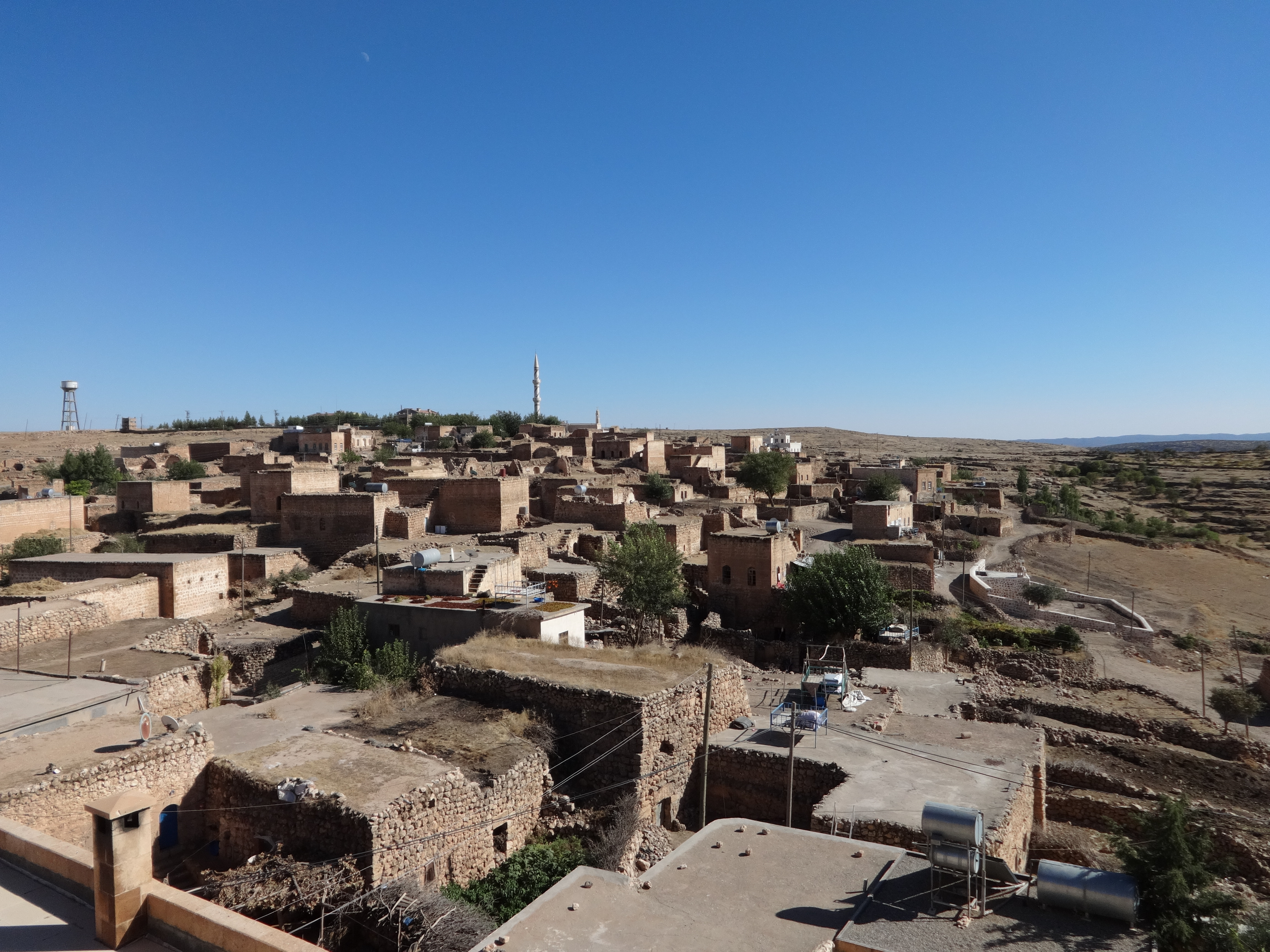
- View of the village from the Church of Mor Azozoel

- Location within Turkey
- Coordinates: 37°26′38″N 41°31′42″E
- Country: Turkey
- Province: Mardin
- District: Midyat
- Population (2021): 214
- Time zone: UTC+3 (TRT)

Altıntaş (Kurdish: Kevirzê, Keferzê; Syriac: ܟܦܪܙܗ, romanized: Kfarze) (Note: Alternatively transliterated as Kafar Ze, Kafarze, Kafarzé, Keferizi, Keferzi, Kfarzeh, Kferze, or Kefr Zeh. Nisba: Kfärzōyo.) is a neighbourhood in the municipality and district of Midyat, Mardin Province in Turkey. The village is inhabited by Syriacs and Kurds of the Dermemikan tribe. The village had a population of 214 in 2021. It is located in the historic region of Tur Abdin.

In the village, there are churches of Mor Azozoyel, Our Lady, Mor Yohannon, and of Mor Abrohom.

== Etymology ==
The Turkish name of the village comprises two words, "altın" ("gold" in Turkish) and "taş" ("stone" in Turkish), therefore Altıntaş translates to "gold stone". The Syriac name of the village is derived from "kefr" ("village" in Syriac).

== History ==
Emperor Anastasius I Dicorus (r. 491–518) is credited with the construction of a church at Kfarze (today called Altıntaş), under the supervision of the craftsmen Theodosius and Theodorus, in a manuscript dated to 1592, however the historian Andrew Palmer argues this was fabricated to add historicity. The Church of Mor Azozoyel was likely constructed in the late 7th century AD. The church of Mor Azozoyel was constructed by 934/935 (AG 1246) at the latest, as indicated by an inscription at the church commemorating the construction of an outdoor oratory (Syriac: beth ṣlutho) in that year. The Monastery of Mor Moses near Kfarze was constructed by AD 1085. There was also a monastery of Mar Iliyya (Elijah) the Bassi near the village.

Kurds looted the church of Mor Azozoyel in 1416 and an icon of the church's patron saint was lost. The Kurdish rebels Yezdanşêr and Mas'ud Beg attacked Kfarze in 1855, severely damaging the church of Mor Azozoyel and killing many of the village's inhabitants, including four priests and monks. The monk Barsoum of Kfarze was counted amongst the residents of the Mor Gabriel Monastery in 1877. The village was visited by the British archaeologist Gertrude Bell in 1909 and 1911. In 1914, Kfarze was inhabited by 350 Syriacs, as per the list presented to the Paris Peace Conference by the Assyro-Chaldean delegation. They adhered to the Syriac Orthodox Church. The Kurdish families at Kfarze belonged to the Ismail clan.

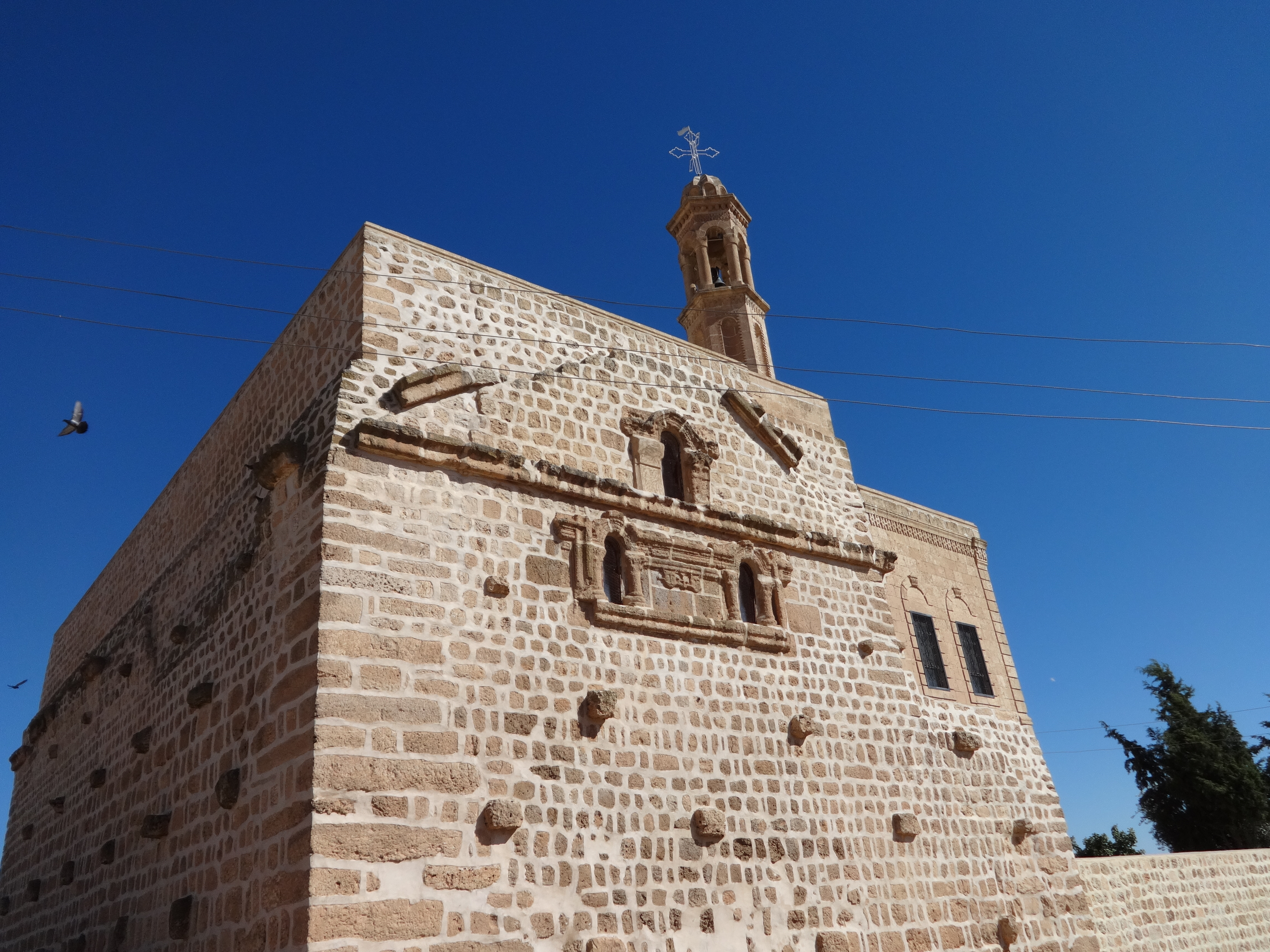
Mor Azozoel Church, the main Syriac Orthodox church in Altıntaş.

Amidst the Sayfo, the Syriacs at Kfarze held a council to decide on a course of action after receiving news of the outbreak of massacres and whilst some argued in favour of arming themselves, most trusted the Ottoman government's assurances of safety. However, Kurdish plans to massacre the Syriacs were leaked and after word had been sent to ‘Ayn-Wardo, armed men arrived and fought off the Kurds to allow the villagers to flee. Although many villagers survived the attack and reached safety at ‘Ayn-Wardo, others went to the Muslim villages of Dermuske and Kafsange and were taken hostage. The villagers at Dermuske were freed by 300 armed Syriacs in an attack that captured the Kurdish leader Abdulrahman’s sister, who was exchanged for the 86 hostages who were held at Kafsange and the surviving villagers of Kfarze subsequently remained at ‘Ayn-Wardo for the remainder of the First World War.

Part of the nave vault of the church of Mor Azozoyel collapsed during the First World War or immediately after, and was restored in 1936. There were 1177 residents in 1960. By 1966, 775 Turoyo-speaking Christians in 130 families inhabited Kfarze and were served by one church. A significant number of the village's Syriac population emigrated abroad to Germany, Belgium, and France in the late 20th century.

== Demography ==
The following is a list of the number of Syriac families that have inhabited Kfarze per year stated. Unless otherwise stated, all figures are from the list provided in Eastern Christianity, Theological Reflection on Religion, Culture, and Politics in the Holy Land and Christian Encounter with Islam and the Muslim World, as noted in the bibliography below. (Note: The size of a single family varies between five and ten persons.)

- 1915: 100/160
- 1966: 130
- 1978: 68
- 1979: 64
- 1981: 42
- 1987: 27
- 1995: 12
- 1997: 12
- 2005: 12
- 2013: 11–12

The following is a list of Kurdish families that have inhabited Kfarze per year stated:

- 1915: 70
- 2005: 35–40
- 2013: 23

== Notable people ==
- Severus of Kfarze, abbot of Qartmin (fl. 410).
- Dionysius David, Syriac Orthodox metropolitan bishop of Qartmin and Beth Risha (r. 1220–1230).
- Basil Behnam, Syriac Orthodox maphrian of Tur Abdin (r. 1561–1562).
- Yuhanna Awgen, Syriac Orthodox metropolitan bishop of Qartmin (r. 1667–1707).
- Julius Simon, Syriac Orthodox metropolitan bishop of the Monastery of the Cross (r. 1833–1856).
- Cyril Zaytun Sawar, Syriac Orthodox metropolitan bishop of the Monastery of the Cross (r. 1842–1854).
- Dionysius Isa Gürbüz, Syriac Orthodox Patriarchal Vicar of Switzerland & Austria (b. 1964)

== Bibliography ==
- Barsoum, Aphrem (2003). The Scattered Pearls: A History of Syriac Literature and Sciences. Translated by Matti Moosa (2nd ed.). Gorgias Press.
- Barsoum, Aphrem (2008). The History of Tur Abdin. Translated by Matti Moosa. Gorgias Press.
- Biner, Zerrin Ozlem (2019). States of Dispossession: Violence and Precarious Coexistence in Southeast Turkey. University of Pennsylvania Press.
- Brock, Sebastian (2021). "The Syrian Orthodox Church in the twentieth century". Eastern Christianity, Theological Reflection on Religion, Culture, and Politics in the Holy Land and Christian Encounter with Islam and the Muslim World (PDF). Living Stones of the Holy Land Trust. pp. 155–181.
- Courtois, Sébastien de (2004). The Forgotten Genocide: Eastern Christians, The Last Arameans. Translated by Vincent Aurora. Gorgias Press.
- Courtois, Sébastien de (2013). "Tur Abdin : Réflexions sur l'état présent descommunautés syriaques du Sud-Est de la Turquie, mémoire, exils, retours". Cahier du Gremmamo (in French). 21: 113–150.
- Csató, Éva Ágnes; Isaksson, Bo; Jahani, Carina (2005). Linguistic Convergence and Areal Diffusion: Case Studies from Iranian, Semitic and Turkic. Psychology Press. ISBN 9780415308045.
- Fiey, Jean Maurice (2004). Lawrence Conrad (ed.). Saints Syriaques (in French). The Darwin Press.
- Gaunt, David (2006). Massacres, Resistance, Protectors: Muslim-Christian Relations in Eastern Anatolia during World War I. Gorgias Press.
- Jongerden, Joost; Verheij, Jelle, eds. (2012). Social Relations in Ottoman Diyarbekir, 1870-1915. Brill.
- Keser Kayaalp, Elif (2021). Church Architecture of Late Antique Northern Mesopotamia. Oxford University Press.
- Palmer, Andrew (1990). Monk and Mason on the Tigris Frontier: The Early History of Tur Abdin. Cambridge University Press.
- Ritter, Hellmut (1967). Turoyo: Die Volkssprache der Syrischen Christen des Tur 'Abdin (in German). Vol. 1. Franz Steiner Verlag.
- Sediyani, İbrahim (2009). Adını arayan coğrafya (in Turkish). Özedönüş Yayınları. ISBN 9786054296002.
- Sinclair, T.A. (1989). Eastern Turkey: An Architectural & Archaeological Survey. Vol. III. Pindar Press. ISBN 9780907132349.
- Tan, Altan (2018). Turabidin'den Berriye'ye. Aşiretler - Dinler - Diller - Kültürler (in Turkish). ISBN 9789944360944.
