= Temelli =

- Sezai Temelli (born 1963) is a Turkish politician
- Temelli Airfield near Ankara, Turkey
- Temelli, Dargeçit, neighbourhood in the municipality and district of Dargeçit, Mardin Province in Turkey
