= Taraklı, Dargeçit =

Taraklı
- Settlement
- Location in Turkey
- Coordinates: 37.6444°N 41.78142°E
- Country: Turkey
- Province: Mardin
- District: Dargeçit
- Time zone: UTC+3 (TRT)

Taraklı (Kurdish: Miştê; Syriac: Maštī) (Note: Also spelt as Mechté, Meshte, Mesthe, Mesti, Meşti, Mište, or Mişti.) is a settlement in the district of Dargeçit, Mardin Province in Turkey. It is populated by Kurds of the Erebiyan tribe. It is located near the Tigris in the historic region of Tur Abdin.

== History ==
Maštī (today called Taraklı) was historically inhabited by Syriac Orthodox Christians. In the Syriac Orthodox patriarchal register of dues of 1870, it was recorded that the village had 14 households, who paid 100 dues, and had one priest. There was a church of Morī Barṣawmō and a church of Morī Sobō. In 1914, the village was populated by 100 Syriacs, according to the list presented to the Paris Peace Conference by the Assyro-Chaldean delegation. There were 40 Turoyo-speaking Syriac families in 1915. It was located in the kaza of Midyat. Amidst the Sayfo, the Syriacs were slaughtered by Kurds from the Ali Rammo tribe. By 1987, there were no remaining Syriacs.

== Bibliography ==
- Bcheiry, Iskandar (2009). The Syriac Orthodox Patriarchal Register of Dues of 1870: An Unpublished Historical Document from the Late Ottoman Period. Gorgias Press.
- Courtois, Sébastien de (2004). The Forgotten Genocide: Eastern Christians, The Last Arameans. Translated by Vincent Aurora. Gorgias Press.
- Gaunt, David (2006). Massacres, Resistance, Protectors: Muslim-Christian Relations in Eastern Anatolia during World War I. Gorgias Press.
- Jongerden, Joost; Verheij, Jelle, eds. (2012). Social Relations in Ottoman Diyarbekir, 1870-1915. Brill.
- Tan, Altan (2018). Turabidin'den Berriye'ye. Aşiretler - Dinler - Diller - Kültürler (in Turkish). Pak Ajans Yayincilik Turizm Ve Diş Ticaret Limited şirketi. ISBN 9789944360944.
- Wießner, Gernot (1993). Christliche Kultbauten im Ṭūr ʻAbdīn (in German). Vol. IV. Harrassowitz Verlag.
