= Mor Azozoel Church =

Church in Midyat District, Turkey

Coordinates: 37°26′43″N 41°31′37″E

- Mor İzozoel Kilisesi
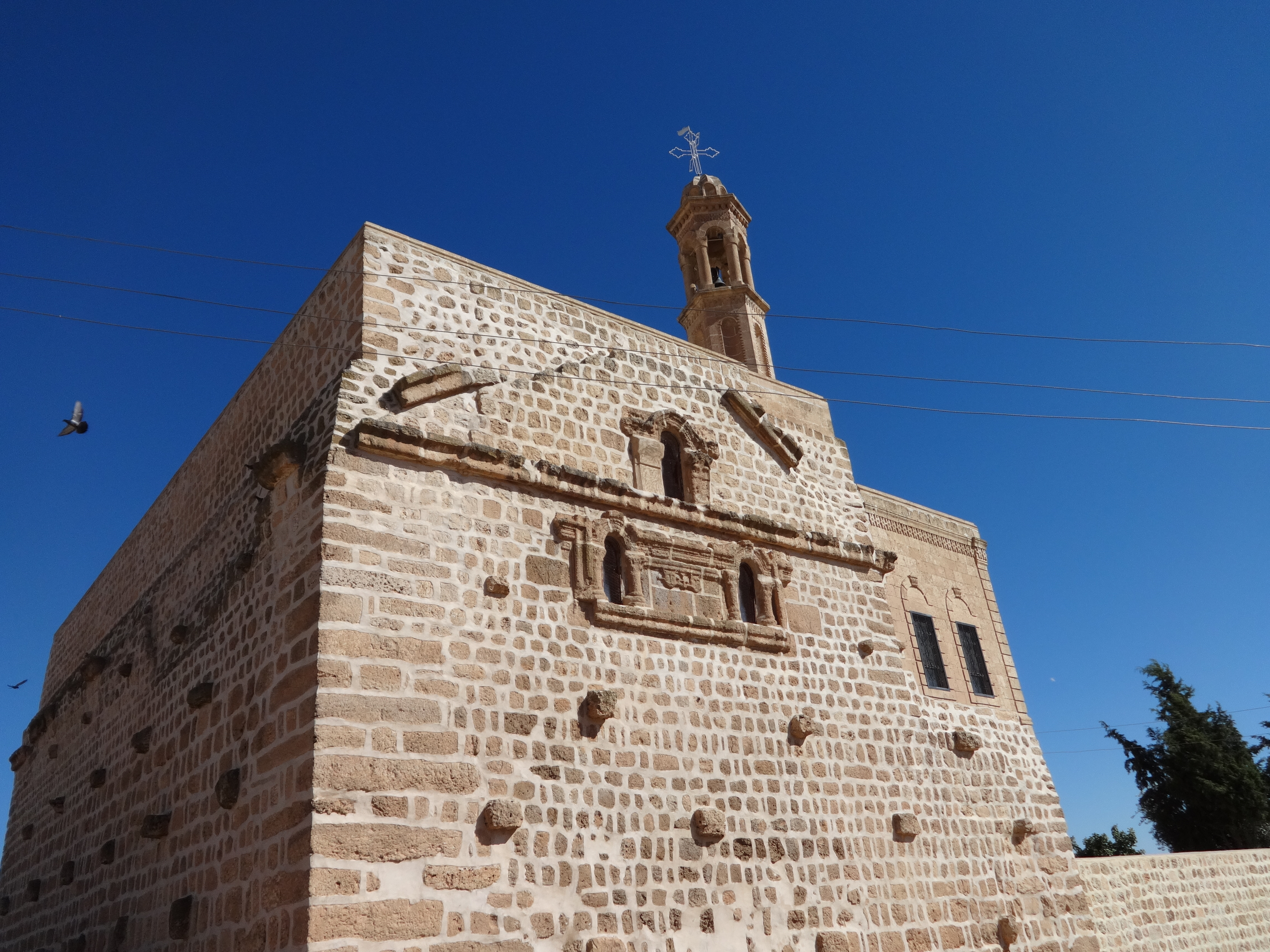

Religion
- Affiliation: Syriac Orthodox

Location
- Location: Altıntaş, Midyat, Mardin, Turkey
- Interactive map of Mor Azozoel Church

Architecture
- Established: 8th century

Mor Azozoel Church is a Syriac Orthodox church located in the Midyat district of Mardin province, Turkey. Situated in the Syriac-inhabited village of Altıntaş, it was built in the 8th century and dedicated to Mor Azozoel. In 2021, it was added to the UNESCO World Heritage Tentative List as part of the Late Antique and Medieval Churches and Monasteries of Midyat and Surrounding Area (Tur ʿAbdin).

== History ==
Mor Azozoel Church was built in the 8th century and dedicated to Mor Azozoel. Kurds looted the church of Mor Azozoel in 1416 and an icon of the church's patron saint was lost. The Kurdish rebels Yezdanşêr and Mas'ud Beg attacked Kfarze in 1855, severely damaging the church of Mor Azozoel and killing many of the village's inhabitants, including four priests and monks. Part of the nave vault of the church of Mor Azozoel collapsed during the First World War or immediately after, and was restored in 1936. In 2021, the church was added to the UNESCO World Heritage Tentative List as part of the Late Antique and Medieval Churches and Monasteries of Midyat and Surrounding Area (Tur ʿAbdin).

== Architecture ==
Mor Azozoel Church was built as a hall-type church. It has large apse archivolts. The church has open-air oratories (beth slutho), which are typical of the region.

== Bibliography ==
- Barsoum, Aphrem (2008). The History of Tur Abdin. Translated by Matti Moosa. Gorgias Press.
- Sinclair, T.A. (1989). Eastern Turkey: An Architectural & Archaeological Survey. Vol. III. Pindar Press. ISBN 9780907132349.
