= Çatalçam, Dargeçit =

Village in Mardin Province, Turkey

Çatalçam
- Neighbourhood
- Location within Turkey
- Coordinates: 37.561°N 41.609°E
- Country: Turkey
- Province: Mardin
- District: Dargeçit
- Population (2021): 33
- Time zone: UTC+3 (TRT)

Çatalçam (Arabic: دير الصليب; Kurdish: Dersalib; (Note: Also spelt as Der Salib or Dersalip.) Syriac: ܕܝܪܐ ܕܨܠܝܒܐ, romanized: Dayro da-Ṣlibo, lit. 'Monastery of the Cross') (Note: Alternatively transliterated as Dayro da Silvo, Dayro da Şlibo, Dayro d’Salibo, Dayro Daslibo, or Dayro du Sliwo. Nisba: Dēr Ṣalībi. Also known as the Monastery of Mar Aho, Monastery of the Cross in Beth El, the Monastery of Beth El, the Holy Cross of Bēth Ēl, or simply Bethil.) is a neighbourhood in the municipality and district of Dargeçit, Mardin Province in Turkey. The village is populated by Syriacs and had population of 33 in 2021. It is located on the slope of Mount Eloyo in the historic region of Tur Abdin.

In the village, there are churches of Mor Aḥō, the Holy Cross, Mor Ḥworo, and Mor Barṣawmo.

== History ==
According to tradition, Dayro da-Ṣlibo (today called Çatalçam) was founded in the sixth century AD by Mor Aḥō (d. 556). It has been suggested that the monastery was probably founded earlier. It is named after a piece of the True Cross that Mor Aḥō had obtained at Constantinople. 300 monks inhabited the monastery according to the hagiography of Mor Aḥō. In the Life of Mor Gabriel of Beth Qustan, the saint is credited with raising the dead at the monastery. In the Zuqnin Chronicle, it is recorded that the monastery lost all of its leading men to plague in 774. The right hand of Mor Gabriel of Beth Qustan may have been brought to the monastery to ward off the plague. A large burial vault adjoining the Church of Mor Aḥō was constructed between 775 and 790.

Sovo, bishop of Tur Abdin, is attested at the monastery before AD 790. The burial vault and Church of Mor Aho was renovated in 1034. After the division of the Syriac Orthodox diocese of Tur Abdin into the dioceses of Qartmin and Ḥaḥ in 1088, the bishops of Ḥaḥ regularly resided at the monastery. The maphrian Athanasius III Ibrahim (Abraham) (r. 1364–1379) was a monk at the monastery. Masʿūd of Zaz, who later became Patriarch of Tur Abdin, was abbot of the monastery from c. 1462/1463 until his ordination as bishop of the Monastery of Mor Quryaqos in Hezza near Zargel and Ḥesno d-Kifo in 1480/1481. In total, the monastery produced one patriarch of Tur Abdin, one maphrian, and six bishops.

=== Ottoman Empire ===
In the mid-19th century, a village developed around the monastery. In the Syriac Orthodox patriarchal register of dues of 1870, it was recorded that the village had 15 households, who paid 42 dues, and was served by the Church of Morī Ahō with one priest and the bishop Atanāsyūs Barṣawm. It served as the see of the bishops of Ḥaḥ until 1873. Oswald Parry noted the village was inhabited by about 20 Syriac families in 1892. In 1914, there were 400 Syriacs at Dayro da-Ṣlibo, according to the list presented to the Paris Peace Conference by the Assyro-Chaldean delegation. They belonged to the Syriac Orthodox Church. It was located in the kaza of Midyat.

Amidst the Sayfo, upon receiving news of the massacres, the villagers took refuge in the monastery with their valuables, animals, and food supply and it was surrounded by neighbouring Kurds, including the Chelik clan of the Ali Rammo tribe led by Mustafa, the Sa’irt, the Beth-Shiroye, the Rama, and some Ottoman soldiers. It was believed that 15,000 men in total besieged the monastery. 30 Syriacs were killed in the first attack. Subsequent attacks using ladders were repulsed with the attackers suffering heavy losses. The battle came to an end when one of the Kurdish leaders, Mustafa of the Ali Rammo tribe, announced that he would withdraw as he had seen miraculous visions coming from the monastery and the other Kurdish tribes left soon afterwards whilst the Turkish soldiers remained. The battle lasted three months.

Shaykh Fathulla of ‘Ayn Kif arrived at the village with people from ‘Ayn-Wardo and attempted to convince the Turkish major to also leave. The Turkish major insisted that the villagers give up their weapons, which they refused to do, and prepared for another attack on the monastery. The Turkish major eventually withdrew upon receiving new orders to do so after Shaykh Fathulla had complained to the provincial government in Diyarbakır. In spite of this, 40 soldiers were stationed at the village by the government ostensibly to protect it against Kurdish attacks. The villagers refused to leave the village, even to tend to their fields, as those few who did were killed or never returned. The soldiers informed some Kurds of a planned trip to buy food from another village and in the resulting ambush seven Syriac men were killed by Kurds, but the women were spared. The villagers chased off the soldiers when they heard about the ambush.

After some time had passed, a local Kurd, Ali Sagfan of Harmes, assembled neighbouring tribesmen, attacked the village at night, and occupied the monastery. Some villagers escaped, but the others in the village at the time were burned alive in a large fire. Only 30 people who had been outside of the monastery at the time of the attack survived.

=== Republic of Turkey ===
There were 180 Turoyo-speaking Christians in 18 families at the village in 1966. By 1967, the village was populated by 88 Kurdish-speaking Christians from nearby villages. On 2 August 1992, the cemetery and villagers' houses were destroyed, and its population forcibly evacuated by the Turkish Armed Forces. Villagers later returned and by 2000 the village was inhabited by 13 people.

On 17 July 2004, Gevriye Arslan, the village mukhtar, was murdered by Kurds after he refused to transfer to them the land of a Christian woman who had been kidnapped and forced to convert to Islam. There was one nun and five Christian families, including some who had returned from Europe, living at the village in 2005. Dayro da-Ṣlibo was inhabited by 2 Syriac families in 2013. A land dispute over the seizure of villagers' land by a neighbouring Kurdish clan that began in 2008 was not resolved until 2015 due to the Kurds' threat of violence. The Kurds were dislodged from the Syriacs' land by a large Turkish military force accompanied by military helicopters.

In September 2026, the village was fully renovated with funds from the diaspora as part of a years-long effort for revitalization. The renovation was celebrated with an official ceremony.

== Demography ==
The following is a list of the number of Syriac Orthodox families that have inhabited Dayro da-Ṣlibo per year stated. Unless otherwise stated, all figures are from the list provided in The Syrian Orthodox Christians in the Late Ottoman Period and Beyond: Crisis then Revival, as noted in the bibliography below.

- 1915: 70
- 1966: 18
- 1978: 19
- 1979: 17
- 1981: 11
- 1987: 8
- 1995: 6

== Bibliography ==
- Atto, Naures (2011). Hostages in the Homeland, Orphans in the Diaspora: Identity Discourses Among the Assyrian/Syriac Elites in the European Diaspora (PDF). Leiden University Press.
- Barsoum, Aphrem (2003). The Scattered Pearls: A History of Syriac Literature and Sciences. Translated by Matti Moosa (2nd ed.). Gorgias Press.
- Barsoum, Aphrem (2008). The History of Tur Abdin. Translated by Matti Moosa. Gorgias Press.
- Baumer, Christoph (2016). The Church of the East: An Illustrated History of Assyrian Christianity. Bloomsbury Publishing.
- Bcheiry, Iskandar (2009). The Syriac Orthodox Patriarchal Register of Dues of 1870: An Unpublished Historical Document from the Late Ottoman Period. Gorgias Press.
- Bcheiry, Iskandar (2010). A List of Syriac Orthodox Ecclesiastic Ordinations from the Sixteenth and Seventeenth Century: The Syriac Manuscript of Hunt 444 (Syr 68 in Bodleian Library, Oxford). Gorgias Press.
- Biner, Zerrin Özlem (2020). States of Dispossession: Violence and Precarious Coexistence in Southeast Turkey. University of Pennsylvania Press.
- Courtois, Sébastien de (2004). The Forgotten Genocide: Eastern Christians, The Last Arameans. Translated by Vincent Aurora. Gorgias Press.
- Courtois, Sébastien de (2013). "Tur Abdin : Réflexions sur l'état présent descommunautés syriaques du Sud-Est de la Turquie,mémoire, exils, retours". Cahier du Gremmamo (in French). 21: 113–150.
- Dinno, Khalid S. (2017). The Syrian Orthodox Christians in the Late Ottoman Period and Beyond: Crisis then Revival. Gorgias Press.
- Gaunt, David (2006). Massacres, Resistance, Protectors: Muslim-Christian Relations in Eastern Anatolia during World War I. Gorgias Press.
- Güsten, Susanne (2016). A Farewell to Tur Abdin (PDF).
- Jongerden, Joost; Verheij, Jelle, eds. (2012). Social Relations in Ottoman Diyarbekir, 1870-1915. Brill.
- Palmer, Andrew (1990). Monk and Mason on the Tigris Frontier: The Early History of Tur Abdin. Cambridge University Press.
- Ritter, Hellmut (1967). Turoyo: Die Volkssprache der Syrischen Christen des Tur 'Abdin (in German). Vol. 1. Franz Steiner Verlag.
- Sinclair, T.A. (1989). Eastern Turkey: An Architectural & Archaeological Survey. Vol. III. Pindar Press. ISBN 9780907132349.
- Takahashi, Hidemi (2011). "al-Ṣalīb, Dayr". Gorgias Encyclopedic Dictionary of the Syriac Heritage. Gorgias Press. pp. 357–358.
- Tan, Altan (2018). Turabidin'den Berriye'ye. Aşiretler - Dinler - Diller - Kültürler (in Turkish). p. 132. ISBN 9789944360944.
- Teule, Herman G. B. (2011). "Masʿūd of Ṭur ʿAbdin". Gorgias Encyclopedic Dictionary of the Syriac Heritage. Gorgias Press. pp. 279–280.
- Wilmshurst, David (2016). Bar Hebraeus The Ecclesiastical Chronicle: An English Translation. Gorgias Press.
