= Kartalkaya (disambiguation) =

Kartalkaya is a ski resort in Seben District, Bolu Province, north-central Turkey.

Kartalkaya may also refer to:

- Kartalkaya Dam, dam in Pazarcık District, Kahramanmaraş Province, south-central Turkey
- Kartalkaya, Dargeçit, neighbourhood in Dargeçit municipality, Dargeçit District, Mardin Province, south-east Turkey
- Kartalkaya, Kırşehir, village in Kırşehir District, Kırşehir Province, central Turkey
- Kartalkaya, Gemerek, village in Gemerek District, Sivas Province, east-central Turkey
