= Danalı, Beşiri =

Village in Batman Province, Turkey

Danalı
- Village
- Location within Turkey
- Coordinates: 37.882°N 41.257°E
- Country: Turkey
- Province: Batman
- District: Beşiri
- Population (2021): 520
- Time zone: UTC+3 (TRT)

Danalı (Kurdish: Zêrcîl; Syriac: ܙܪܓܠ, romanized: Zarjal) (Note: Also known as Cherchel, Tchertchèl, Zargel, Zarğel, Zarğil, Zarjel, Zercil, Zerjili, Zerdjili, or Zerjel.) is a village in the Beşiri District of Batman Province in Turkey. The village is populated by Kurds of the Sinikan tribe and had a population of 520 in 2021.

== History ==
Zarjal (today called Danalı) was historically inhabited by Kurdish-speaking Syriac Orthodox Christians and Armenians. Yeshu’ of Zarjal was abbot of the Monastery of the Syrians in Egypt in 1254–1257. The monk Tuma of Zarjal was amongst those who were killed by the men of Timur in the Cave of Ibn Siqi in 1394 (AG 1605).

In the Syriac Orthodox patriarchal register of dues of 1870, it was recorded that the village had 21 households, who paid 50 dues, and had one priest. There was a Syriac Orthodox church of Morī Eliyyō. There were 32 Armenian hearths in 1880. There was an Armenian church of Surb Kirakos.

It was located in the Beşiri kaza in the Diyarbakır sanjak in the Diyarbekir vilayet in c. 1900. It was populated by 300 Syriacs in 1914, according to the list presented to the Paris Peace Conference by the Assyro-Chaldean delegation.

== Ecclesiastical history ==
Zarjal, also known as Hazza or Hezzo, was a diocese of the Syriac Orthodox Church. The episcopal seat was at the Monastery of Mar Quryaqos. Timothy was ordained as bishop of Hezzo by Patriarch Athanasius VI bar Khamoro (r. 1091–1129). In 1363, the diocese of Hezzo came under the Patriarchate of Tur Abdin following its schism with the Patriarchate of Mardin.

Basilius, metropolitan of Zarjal in 1415–1419, was ordained by Patriarch Yeshu’ I of Tur Abdin. Basilius Yeshu’ Jallo of Ayn Ward, metropolitan of Zarjal in 1444–1450 or 1442–1455, also known as the bishop of Hezzo, was ordained by Patriarch Hanukh of Tur Abdin; (Note: Also known as Basilius Yeshu’ Jallo of Salah.) he became patriarch of Tur Abdin in 1455 and died in 1460. Basilius Shaba of Arbo, metropolitan of Zarjal in 1463–1480/1481/1482, was ordained by Patriarch Aziz of Tur Abdin. In 1482, on the death of Patriarch Aziz of Tur Abdin, Basilius Shaba was elected as his successor and he served in that office until his death in 1488. Basilius Mas’ud of Zaz, metropolitan of Zarjal, Arzen, Se’ert and Hisn Kifa in 1481–1491/1492 was ordained by Patriarch Shaba of Tur Abdin. Basilus Yeshu’ II of Zaz, metropolitan of Zarjal in 1492/1493–1516, son of the monk Hoshab of Zaz, was ordained by his uncle the Patriarch Mas’ud of Zaz, who Yeshu’ succeeded as patriarch of Tur Abdin in 1516.

Basil Yunan (Jonah), metropolitan of Zarjal in 1524–1540, was ordained by Patriarch Shim’un (Simon). Basilius Yaqub (Jacob) the Hisni (of Hisn Kifa), metropolitan of Zarjal in 1543–1551/1552/1553, son of the priest Shams al–Din, was ordained by Patriarch Shim’un (Simon); he subsequently became patriarch of Tur Abdin. Basilius Saliba Awad, metropolitan of Zarjal in 1552–1566 or 1553–1563, was ordained by Patriarch Yaqub (Jacob). Basilius Yeshu’ III of Zaz, metropolitan of Zarjal in 1590–1602, was ordained by Patriarch Ignatius David II Shah. Jacob, metropolitan of Zarjal, was encountered by Leonard Abel in 1583.

In the 18th century, the diocese also became known as Bšeriyyah. Basil Abraham of Midyat resigned as metropolitan of Zarjal in 1702. Basilius ‘Abd Al-Ahad was bishop of Zarjal in 1705. Basil George Abraham Abd al-Nur of Aleppo is attested as metropolitan of Zarjal from 1707 until his resignation in 1737. Abraham was metropolitan of Zarjal until his death in 1742. Gregory Boghos, bishop general since 1732, later became bishop of Bushairiyya and died in 1764. Gregory Simon was metropolitan of Zarjal in 1766–1772. Cyriacus or Cyril Elias Shay Allah of Mardin was metropolitan of Zarjal until his death in 1805 due to poisoning.

Iwanis Yalda was metropolitan of Zarjal in 1806–1830. Gregory John Djazmahdji was removed as metropolitan of Zarjal two or three times for squandering Church property in 1819–1849 and died in 1853/1854; he was replaced by Dionysius Gabriel in 1825–1834. Intimos Joseph was metropolitan of Zarjal in 1851–1857. The diocese of Besheriyeh, Deir Mor Quryaqos, Radvan, Garzan and villages served approximately 30,800 adherents in c. 1870. Cyril George of Mardin was metropolitan of Zarjal in 1871/1872–1881. Around this time, Joseph of Qulleth, son of Abdi the carpenter, held the see for five or six years and was deposed twice. Athanasius Jacob Grego of Midyat was bishop of Bushairiyya in 1897–1901; he subsequently became metropolitan of Nisibin and then metropolitan of Midyat in 1906–1910 and died in May 1911.

== Bibliography ==
- Barsoum, Aphrem (2008). The History of Tur Abdin. Translated by Matti Moosa. Gorgias Press.
- Barsoum, Aphrem (2009a). History of the Syriac Dioceses. Vol. 1. Translated by Matti Moosa. Gorgias Press.
- Barsoum, Aphrem (2009b). The Collected Historical Essays of Aphram I Barsoum. Vol. 1. Translated by Matti Moosa. Gorgias Press.
- Bcheiry, Iskandar (2009). The Syriac Orthodox Patriarchal Register of Dues of 1870: An Unpublished Historical Document from the Late Ottoman Period. Gorgias Press.
- Bcheiry, Iskandar (2010). A List of Syriac Orthodox Ecclesiastic Ordinations from the Sixteenth and Seventeenth Century: The Syriac Manuscript of Hunt 444 (Syr 68 in Bodleian Library, Oxford). Gorgias Press.
- Chabot, Jean-Baptiste, ed. (1905). Chronique de Michel le Syrien (in French). Vol. III. Paris: Ernest Leroux.
- Dinno, Khalid S. (2017). The Syrian Orthodox Christians in the Late Ottoman Period and Beyond: Crisis then Revival. Gorgias Press.
- Fiey, Jean Maurice (1993). Pour un Oriens Christianus Novus: Répertoire des diocèses syriaques orientaux et occidentaux (in French).
- Gaunt, David (2006). Massacres, Resistance, Protectors: Muslim-Christian Relations in Eastern Anatolia during World War I. Gorgias Press.
- Jongerden, Joost; Verheij, Jelle, eds. (2012). Social Relations in Ottoman Diyarbekir, 1870-1915. Brill.
- Kévorkian, Raymond H. (2006). "Demographic Changes in the Armenian Population of Diarbekir, 1895-1914". In Richard G. Hovannisian (ed.). Armenian Tigranakert/Diarbekir and Edessa/Urfa. Mazda Publishers. pp. 250–284.
