= Alayunt, Dargeçit =

Village in Mardin Province, Turkey

Alayunt
- Neighbourhood
- Location within Turkey
- Coordinates: 37.561°N 41.657°E
- Country: Turkey
- Province: Mardin
- District: Dargeçit
- Population (2021): 247
- Time zone: UTC+3 (TRT)

Alayunt or Alayurt (Kurdish: Arbayê; Syriac: Arbaye) (Note: Alternatively transliterated as ‘Arbāe, Arbai, Arbay, Arbaya, Arbayé, ‘Arbāyyah, or Arbio. Nisba: ‘Arbāyī.) is a neighbourhood in the municipality and district of Dargeçit, Mardin Province in Turkey. The village is populated by Kurds of the Erebiyan tribe and had a population of 247 in 2021. It is located in the historic region of Tur Abdin.

In the village, there are churches of Mar Saba and Mar Jirjis.

== History ==
Arbaye (today called Alayunt) was historically inhabited by Syriac Orthodox Christians. The Church of Mar Saba at Arbaye is believed to have been constructed in the eighth century. In the Syriac Orthodox patriarchal register of dues of 1870, it was recorded that the village had 26 households, who paid 43 dues, and did not have a priest. In 1914, the village was inhabited by 250 Syriacs, according to the list presented to the Paris Peace Conference by the Assyro-Chaldean delegation. Amidst the Sayfo, Kurds led by Ali Musa of Dayvan murdered most of the Syriacs and destroyed the Church of Mar Saba. The Church of Mar Jirjis was rebuilt in the 1940s. The village had a population of 295 in 1960. There were 215 Kurdish-speaking Christians in 32 families at Arbaye in 1966. By 1987, there were no remaining Syriacs.

== Demography ==
The following is a list of the number of Syriac families that have inhabited Arbaye per year stated. Unless otherwise stated, all figures are from the list provided in The Syrian Orthodox Christians in the Late Ottoman Period and Beyond: Crisis then Revival, as noted in the bibliography below.

- 1915: 30
- 1966: 32
- 1978: 18 (Note: Some scholars suggest the last Syriacs left the village in 1978.)
- 1979: 13
- 1987: 0

== Bibliography ==
- Barsoum, Aphrem (2008). The History of Tur Abdin. Translated by Matti Moosa. Gorgias Press.
- Bcheiry, Iskandar (2009). The Syriac Orthodox Patriarchal Register of Dues of 1870: An Unpublished Historical Document from the Late Ottoman Period. Gorgias Press.
- Bcheiry, Iskandar (2019). "Digitizing and Schematizing the Archival Material from the Late Ottoman Period Found in the Monastery of al-Zaʿfarān in Southeast Turkey". Atla Summary of Proceedings. 72 (January): 50–61. doi:10.31046/proceedings.2018.113.
- Biner, Zerrin Özlem (2020). States of Dispossession: Violence and Precarious Coexistence in Southeast Turkey. University of Pennsylvania Press.
- Courtois, Sébastien de (2004). The Forgotten Genocide: Eastern Christians, The Last Arameans. Translated by Vincent Aurora. Gorgias Press.
- Courtois, Sébastien de (2013). "Tur Abdin : Réflexions sur l'état présent descommunautés syriaques du Sud-Est de la Turquie, mémoire, exils, retours". Cahier du Gremmamo (in French). 21: 113–150.
- Dinno, Khalid S. (2017). The Syrian Orthodox Christians in the Late Ottoman Period and Beyond: Crisis then Revival. Gorgias Press.
- Gaunt, David (2006). Massacres, Resistance, Protectors: Muslim-Christian Relations in Eastern Anatolia during World War I. Gorgias Press.
- Hollerweger, Hans; Palmer, Andrew (1999). Turabdin: Living Cultural Heritage (in English, German, and Turkish) (2nd ed.). Friends of Tur Abdin.
- Jongerden, Joost; Verheij, Jelle, eds. (2012). Social Relations in Ottoman Diyarbekir, 1870-1915. Brill.
- Keser-Kayaalp, Elif, ed. (January 2022). Syriac Architectural Heritage at Risk in TurʿAbdin (PDF).
- Ritter, Hellmut (1967). Turoyo: Die Volkssprache der Syrischen Christen des Tur 'Abdin (in German). Vol. 1. Franz Steiner Verlag.
- Tan, Altan (2018). Turabidin'den Berriye'ye. Aşiretler - Dinler - Diller - Kültürler (in Turkish). Pak Ajans Yayincilik Turizm Ve Diş Ticaret Limited şirketi. ISBN 9789944360944.
