= Mor Sobo Church =

Syriac Orthodox church in Mardin Province, Turkey

Coordinates: 37.4765°N 41.6101°E

- Mor Sobo Kilisesi

Religion
- Affiliation: Syriac Orthodox

Location
- Location: Anıtlı, Midyat, Mardin, Turkey
- Interactive map of Mor Sobo Church

Architecture
- Established: 6th century

Mor Sobo Church is a Syriac Orthodox church located in the Midyat district of Mardin province, Turkey. Situated in the Syriac-inhabited village of Anıtlı, it was built in the 6th century and dedicated to Mor Sobo, a Persian prince who was killed for being a Christian. It was actively used until the 15th century and is now in ruins. In 2021, it was added to the UNESCO World Heritage Tentative List as part of the Late Antique and Medieval Churches and Monasteries of Midyat and Surrounding Area (Tur ʿAbdin).

== Architecture ==
Mor Sobo Church was built in the east-west direction. It has a rectangular plan, a single nave and three narthexes.
