= Kısmetli, Dargeçit =

Village in Mardin Province, Turkey

Kısmetli
- Neighbourhood
- Location in Turkey
- Coordinates: 37.500°N 41.711°E
- Country: Turkey
- Province: Mardin
- District: Dargeçit
- Population (2021): 137
- Time zone: UTC+3 (TRT)

Kısmetli (Kurdish: Basiqil kêvil; Syriac: Beth Sqole) (Note: Alternatively transliterated as Baskil or Ba Siqle.) is a neighbourhood in the municipality and district of Dargeçit, Mardin Province in Turkey. The village is populated by Kurds of the Basiqil tribe and had a population of 137 in 2021. It is located in the historic region of Tur Abdin.

In the village, there is a church of Mort Saro.

== History ==
Beth Sqole (today called Kısmetli) was set on fire by Emir Bidayn in 1714 according to a Syriac memro (metrical ode) written by the priest Yuhanna of Basibrina from the Qardash family.

== See also ==
- Karagöl, Dargeçit

== Bibliography ==
- Barsoum, Aphrem (2008). The History of Tur Abdin. Translated by Matti Moosa. Gorgias Press.
- Keser-Kayaalp, Elif, ed. (January 2022). Syriac Architectural Heritage at Risk in TurʿAbdin (PDF).
- Tan, Altan (2018). Turabidin'den Berriye'ye. Aşiretler - Dinler - Diller - Kültürler (in Turkish). Pak Ajans Yayincilik Turizm Ve Diş Ticaret Limited şirketi. ISBN 9789944360944.
