= St. Mary Church (Anıtlı) =

Church in Midyat, Turkey

- Meryem Ana Kilisesi
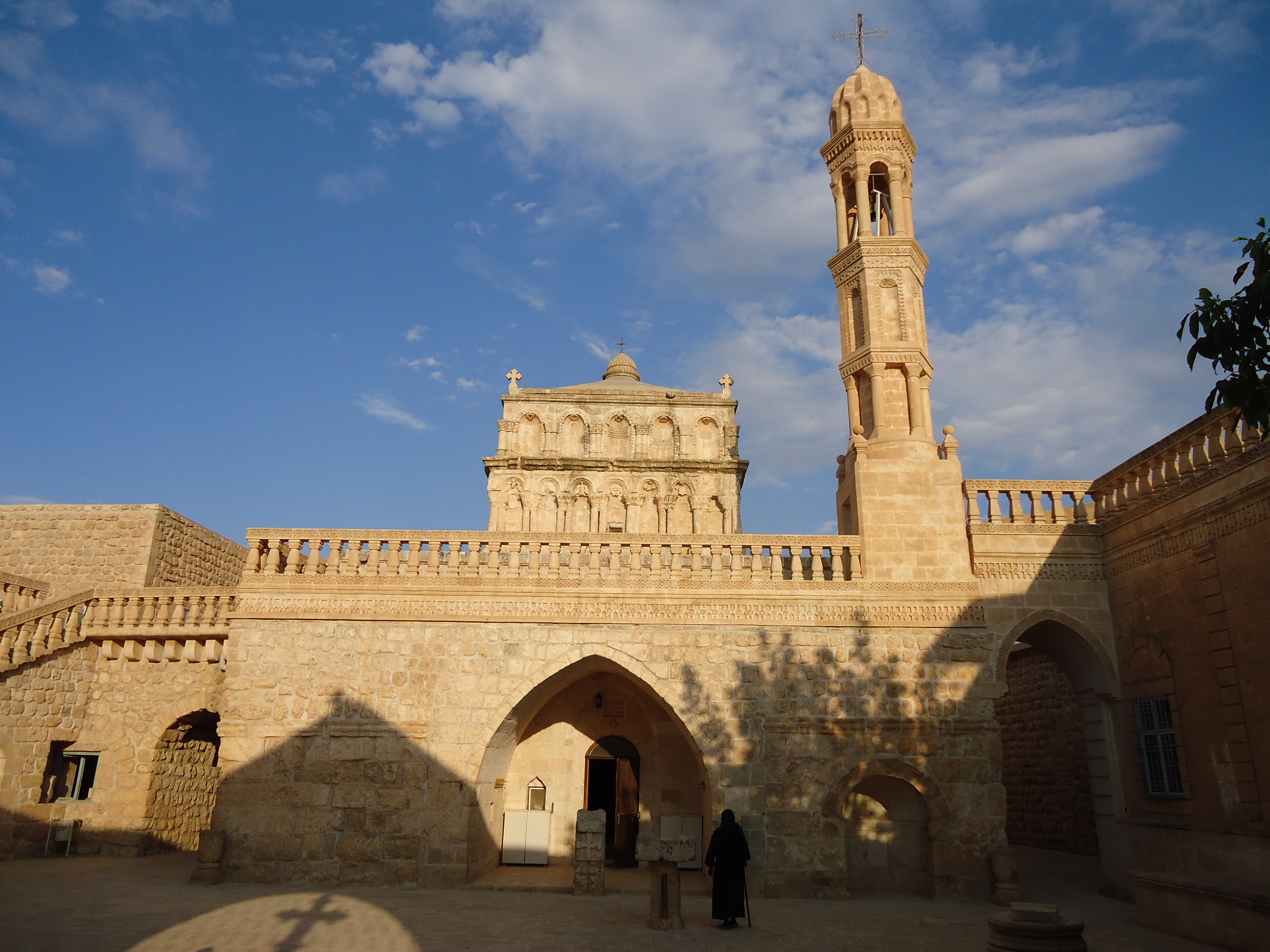

Religion
- Affiliation: Syriac Orthodox

Location
- Location: Anıtlı, Midyat, Mardin, Turkey
- Interactive map of St. Mary Church

Architecture
- Established: 8th century

St. Mary Church is a Syriac Orthodox church located in the Midyat district of Mardin province, Turkey. Situated in the Syriac-inhabited village of Anıtlı, it was built in the 8th century and dedicated to Mary, mother of Jesus. In 2021, it was added to the UNESCO World Heritage Tentative List as part of the Late Antique and Medieval Churches and Monasteries of Midyat and Surrounding Area (Tur ʿAbdin).

== Architecture ==
St. Mary Church, which has the characteristics of a monastery church, was built in the north-south direction. It has a narthex, a naos and an apse.
