= Karagöl, Dargeçit =

Village in Mardin Province, Turkey

Karagöl
- Settlement
- Location in Turkey
- Coordinates: 37°29′33″N 41°41′07″E
- Country: Turkey
- Province: Mardin
- District: Dargeçit
- Time zone: UTC+3 (TRT)

Karagöl (Kurdish: Derqub; (Note: Also spelt as Der Kub, Derkop, Derkup, or Dirkup.) Syriac: Dayro d-Qubo) (Note: Alternatively transliterated as Beïr-Kébé, Dayr al-Qubah, Dayr Qubbe, Dayr Qube, Dayro d-Qube, Dayro Qubo, Deirqubbe, Der Qubbe, Derkube, Derkubé, Derqubbē, or Der-Qube. Nisba: Dērqubbī.) is a settlement in the district of Dargeçit, Mardin Province in Turkey. It is located in the historic region of Tur Abdin.

In the village, there is a church of Morī Ya'qūb.

== Etymology ==
The Kurdish name of the village is derived from "Der Yakub". It begins with the word "dayr" ("monastery" in Aramaic).

== History ==
In the Syriac Orthodox patriarchal register of dues of 1870, it was recorded that Dayro d-Qubo (today called Karagöl) had twelve households, who paid thirty-eight dues, and did not have a priest. In 1914, it was inhabited by 100 Syriacs, according to the list presented to the Paris Peace Conference by the Assyro-Chaldean delegation. They belonged to the Syriac Orthodox Church. It was located in the kaza (district) of Midyat. Amidst the Sayfo, the villagers were escorted to safety at Hah by Agha Hajo of the Kurtak clan.

95 Turoyo-speaking Christians in 15 families resided at Dayro d-Qubo in 1966. The village was forcibly evacuated by the Turkish army in 1995 due to the Kurdish–Turkish conflict and its population moved to the nearby village of Beth Kustan. By 2003, five families had returned to Dayro d-Qubo and had begun building two new houses and restoring the village's church that had been vandalised by Kurds. In 2013, the village was inhabited by 4 Syriac families.

== Demography ==
The following is a list of the number of Syriac Orthodox families that have inhabited Dayro d-Qubo per year stated. Unless otherwise stated, all figures are from the list provided in The Syrian Orthodox Christians in the Late Ottoman Period and Beyond: Crisis then Revival, as noted in the bibliography below.

- 1915: 10
- 1966: 15
- 1978: 12
- 1979: 7
- 1981: 4
- 1995: 2

== Bibliography ==
- Atto, Naures (2011). Hostages in the Homeland, Orphans in the Diaspora: Identity Discourses Among the Assyrian/Syriac Elites in the European Diaspora (PDF). Leiden University Press.
- Barsoum, Aphrem (2008). The History of Tur Abdin. Translated by Matti Moosa. Gorgias Press.
- Bcheiry, Iskandar (2009). The Syriac Orthodox Patriarchal Register of Dues of 1870: An Unpublished Historical Document from the Late Ottoman Period. Gorgias Press.
- Biner, Zerrin Özlem (2020). States of Dispossession: Violence and Precarious Coexistence in Southeast Turkey. University of Pennsylvania Press.
- Bizzeti, Paolo; Chialà, Sabino (2024). Turchia: Chiese e monasteri di tradizione siriaca (in Italian) (2nd ed.). Edizioni Terra Santa.
- Courtois, Sébastien de (2004). The Forgotten Genocide: Eastern Christians, The Last Arameans. Translated by Vincent Aurora. Gorgias Press.
- Courtois, Sébastien de (2013). "Tur Abdin : Réflexions sur l'état présent descommunautés syriaques du Sud-Est de la Turquie, mémoire, exils, retours". Cahier du Gremmamo (in French). 21: 113–150.
- Dinno, Khalid S. (2017). The Syrian Orthodox Christians in the Late Ottoman Period and Beyond: Crisis then Revival. Gorgias Press.
- Gaunt, David (2006). Massacres, Resistance, Protectors: Muslim-Christian Relations in Eastern Anatolia during World War I. Gorgias Press.
- Hollerweger, Hans; Palmer, Andrew (1999). Turabdin: Living Cultural Heritage (in English, German, and Turkish) (2nd ed.). Friends of Tur Abdin.
- Jongerden, Joost; Verheij, Jelle, eds. (2012). Social Relations in Ottoman Diyarbekir, 1870-1915. Brill.
- Keser-Kayaalp, Elif, ed. (January 2022). Syriac Architectural Heritage at Risk in TurʿAbdin (PDF).
- Palmer, Andrew (1990). Monk and Mason on the Tigris Frontier: The Early History of Tur Abdin. Cambridge University Press.
- Ritter, Hellmut (1967). Turoyo: Die Volkssprache der Syrischen Christen des Tur 'Abdin (in German). Vol. 1. Franz Steiner Verlag.
- Sinclair, T.A. (1989). Eastern Turkey: An Architectural & Archaeological Survey. Vol. III. Pindar Press.
