= Baysun, Dargeçit =

Village in Mardin Province, Turkey

Baysun
- Neighbourhood
- Location in Turkey
- Coordinates: 37.444°N 41.781°E
- Country: Turkey
- Province: Mardin
- District: Dargeçit
- Population (2021): 52
- Time zone: UTC+3 (TRT)

Baysun (Kurdish: Ezdîna) is a neighbourhood in the municipality and district of Dargeçit, Mardin Province in Turkey. The village is populated by Kurds of the Omerkan tribe and had a population of 52 in 2021.
