= Gürgen, Dargeçit =

Village in Mardin Province, Turkey

Gürgen
- Neighbourhood
- Location in Turkey
- Coordinates: 37.613°N 41.697°E
- Country: Turkey
- Province: Mardin
- District: Dargeçit
- Population (2021): 12
- Time zone: UTC+3 (TRT)

Gürgen (Kurdish: Botijê) is a neighbourhood in the municipality and district of Dargeçit, Mardin Province in Turkey. The village is populated by Kurds of the Basiqil tribe and had a population of 12 in 2021.
