= Kumdere, Dargeçit =

Village in Mardin Province, Turkey

Kumdere
- Neighbourhood
- Location in Turkey
- Coordinates: 37.573°N 41.694°E
- Country: Turkey
- Province: Mardin
- District: Dargeçit
- Population (2021): 23
- Time zone: UTC+3 (TRT)

Kumdere (Kurdish: Şibêbiyê) is a neighbourhood in the municipality and district of Dargeçit, Mardin Province in Turkey. The village is populated by Kurds of the Basiqil tribe and had a population of 23 in 2021.
