= Altınoluk, Dargeçit =

Village in Mardin Province, Turkey

Altınoluk
- Neighbourhood
- Location in Turkey
- Coordinates: 37.660°N 41.723°E
- Country: Turkey
- Province: Mardin
- District: Dargeçit
- Population (2021): 321
- Time zone: UTC+3 (TRT)

Altınoluk (Kurdish: Gera Cafer) is a neighbourhood in the municipality and district of Dargeçit, Mardin Province in Turkey. The village is populated by Kurds of the Erebiyan tribe and had a population of 321 in 2021.
