= Akçaköy, Dargeçit =

Village in Mardin Province, Turkey

Akçaköy
- Neighbourhood
- Location in Turkey
- Coordinates: 37.564°N 41.771°E
- Country: Turkey
- Province: Mardin
- District: Dargeçit
- Population (2021): 24
- Time zone: UTC+3 (TRT)

Akçaköy (Kurdish: Îzar) is a neighbourhood in the municipality and district of Dargeçit, Mardin Province in Turkey. The village is populated by Kurds of the Erebiyan tribe and had a population of 24 in 2021.
