= Bostanlı, Dargeçit =

Village in Mardin Province, Turkey

Bostanlı
- Neighbourhood
- Location in Turkey
- Coordinates: 37.433°N 41.798°E
- Country: Turkey
- Province: Mardin
- District: Dargeçit
- Population (2021): 244
- Time zone: UTC+3 (TRT)

Bostanlı (Kurdish: Wersikê) is a neighbourhood in the municipality and district of Dargeçit, Mardin Province in Turkey. The village is populated by Kurds of the Omerkan tribe and had a population of 244 in 2021.
