= Bağözü, Dargeçit =

Village in Mardin Province, Turkey

Bağözü
- Neighbourhood
- Location in Turkey
- Coordinates: 37.539°N 41.775°E
- Country: Turkey
- Province: Mardin
- District: Dargeçit
- Population (2021): 148
- Time zone: UTC+3 (TRT)

Bağözü (Kurdish: Trîwa) is a neighbourhood in the municipality and district of Dargeçit, Mardin Province in Turkey. The village is populated by Kurds of the Erebiyan tribe and had a population of 148 in 2021.
