= Ilısu, Dargeçit =

Village in Mardin Province, Turkey

Ilısu
- Neighbourhood
- Location in Turkey
- Coordinates: 37.537°N 41.820°E
- Country: Turkey
- Province: Mardin
- District: Dargeçit
- Population (2021): 729
- Time zone: UTC+3 (TRT)

Ilısu (Kurdish: Germav) is a neighbourhood in the municipality and district of Dargeçit, Mardin Province in Turkey. The village is populated by Kurds of the Erebiyan tribe and had a population of 792 in 2021.
