= Yusuf Çetin =

Filüksinos Yusuf Çetin, (born 20 August 1954), also called Filiksinos Yusuf Çetin Archbishop Mor Philoxenus Yusuf Cetin, is an Aramaic Christian religious leader who has served as the Patriarchal Vicar of the Syriac Orthodox Church in Istanbul, Ankara, and İzmir since 1986.

A native of the Dargeçit district of Turkey, known to its Assyrian & Aramean native population as Kerburan, and located in southeastern Anatolia's Mardin Province, Yusuf Çetin expressed interest in Syriac Church doctrine at an early age. While completing his secondary education, he also learned the Syriac language and subsequently attended his home province's Mor Gabriel Monastery, Syriac Orthodoxy's oldest surviving monastic institution. Demonstrating an aptitude for learning and spiritual instruction, he was ordained a priest in 1971 at the age of 17. Shortly thereafter, he was entrusted with teaching theology. By 1977, he was consecrated with the title of "spiritual" and invited by Patriarch Moran Mor Ignatius Zakka I Iwas to Syria, enabling him to attend St. Mor Efrem School of Theology in Damascus, where he received a diploma after three years of study and was ultimately appointed dean of the school.

On 28 September 1986, at the request of Istanbul's Syriac community, Mor Filiksinos Yusuf Çetin was elevated by the Patriarch to the rank of Metropolitan bishop and assigned to the diocese of İstanbul and Ankara as the Patriarchal Vicar. On 30 November 2006, twenty years into his service, he held talks with Pope Benedict XVI as the pontiff initiated his visit to 2006 papal journey to Turkey.
