= Kılavuz, Dargeçit =

Village in Mardin Province, Turkey

Kılavuz
- Neighbourhood
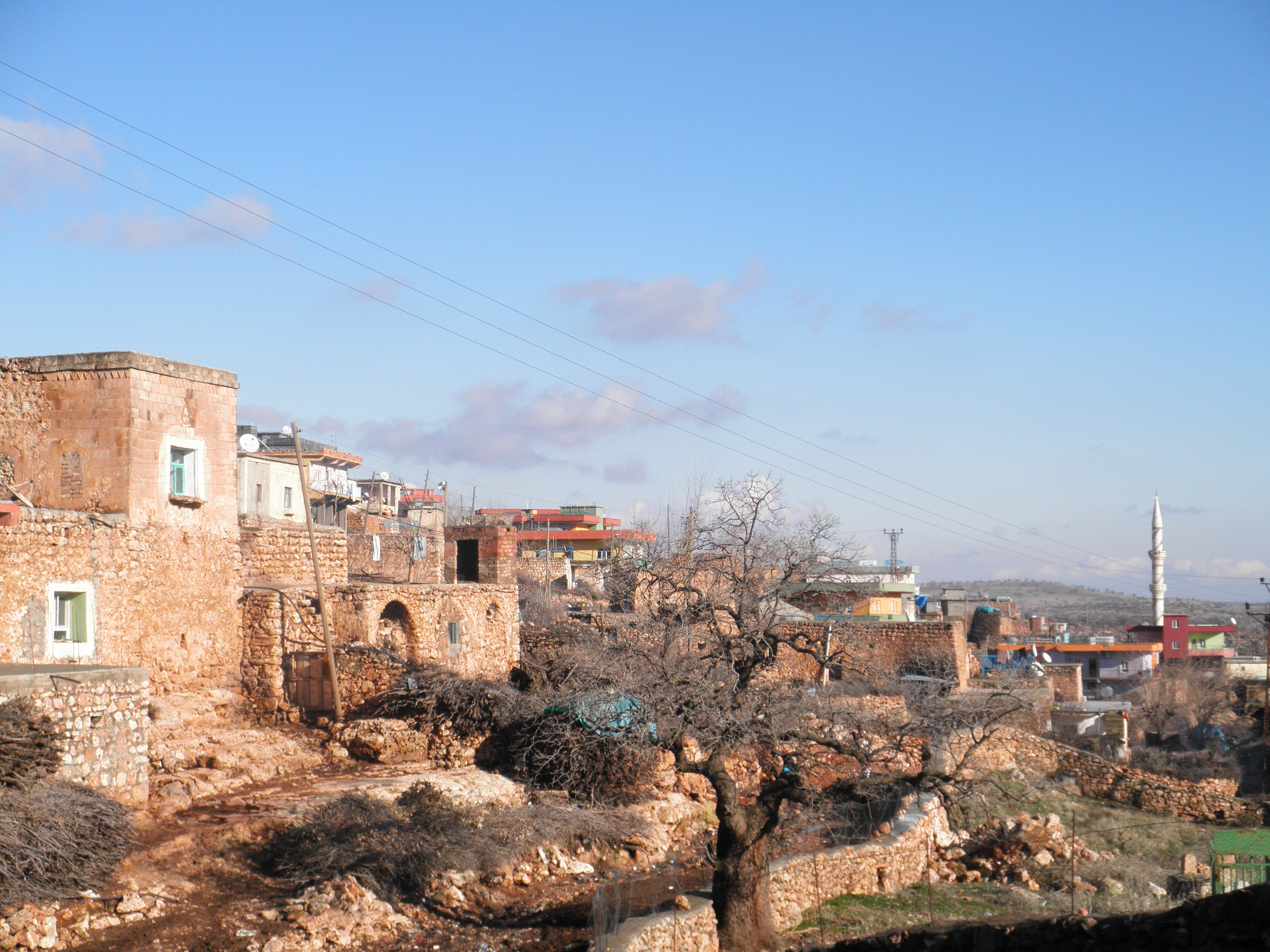

- Location within Turkey
- Coordinates: 37.481°N 41.779°E
- Country: Turkey
- Province: Mardin
- District: Dargeçit
- Population (2022): 2,164
- Time zone: UTC+3 (TRT)

Kılavuz (Kurdish: Xelilan) is a neighbourhood of the municipality and district of Dargeçit, Mardin Province, Turkey. Its population is 2,164 (2022). Before the 2013 reorganisation, it was a town (belde). It is populated by Kurds of the Erebiyan and Sinikan tribes.
