= Beğendi, Dargeçit =

Village in Mardin Province, Turkey

Beğendi
- Neighbourhood
- Location in Turkey
- Coordinates: 37.437°N 41.727°E
- Country: Turkey
- Province: Mardin
- District: Dargeçit
- Population (2021): 89
- Time zone: UTC+3 (TRT)

Beğendi (Kurdish: Gizrê) is a neighbourhood in the municipality and district of Dargeçit, Mardin Province in Turkey. The village is populated by Kurds of the Omerkan tribe and had a population of 89 in 2021.
