= Çelikköy, Dargeçit =

Village in Mardin Province, Turkey

Çelikköy
- Neighbourhood
- Location in Turkey
- Coordinates: 37.655°N 41.803°E
- Country: Turkey
- Province: Mardin
- District: Dargeçit
- Population (2021): 67
- Time zone: UTC+3 (TRT)

Çelikköy (Kurdish: Çêlik; Syriac: Chelik) (Note: Alternatively transliterated as Ğeālek, Gelik, or Tjélek.) is a neighbourhood in the municipality and district of Dargeçit, Mardin Province in Turkey. The village is populated by Kurds of the Erebiyan tribe and had a population of 67 in 2021. It is located in the historic region of Tur Abdin.

== History ==
Chelik (today called Çelikköy) was historically inhabited by Kurdish-speaking Syriac Orthodox Christians. In the mid-nineteenth century, the village was reportedly populated by 400–500 Syriacs. In the Syriac Orthodox patriarchal register of dues of 1870, it was recorded that Chelik had seven households, who paid sixty-nine dues, and it had one priest, but it did not have a church. In 1914, it was inhabited by 100 Syriacs, according to the list presented to the Paris Peace Conference by the Assyro-Chaldean delegation. It was located in the kaza (district) of Midyat. There were ten or twenty Syriac families in 1915. The village served as the residence of the Kurdish Rammo tribal leader Mustafa Agha. Amidst the Sayfo, the village's Syriac population was massacred by the Ali Rammo tribe. The Nahiyah of Chelik served as the centre of the Erebi (Arap) tribe until 1927. By 1987, there were no remaining Syriacs at Chelik.

== Bibliography ==
- Aras, Ramazan (2005). Migration and Memory: Assyrian Identity in Mardin Kerboran/Dargeçit (Master of Arts in History thesis). Boğaziçi University.
- Bcheiry, Iskandar (2009). The Syriac Orthodox Patriarchal Register of Dues of 1870: An Unpublished Historical Document from the Late Ottoman Period. Gorgias Press.
- Courtois, Sébastien de (2004). The Forgotten Genocide: Eastern Christians, The Last Arameans. Translated by Vincent Aurora. Gorgias Press.
- Gaunt, David (2006). Massacres, Resistance, Protectors: Muslim-Christian Relations in Eastern Anatolia during World War I. Gorgias Press.
- Jongerden, Joost; Verheij, Jelle, eds. (2012). Social Relations in Ottoman Diyarbekir, 1870-1915. Brill.
- Tan, Altan (2011). Turabidin'den Berriye'ye. Aşiretler - Dinler - Diller - Kültürler (in Turkish). Pak Ajans Yayincilik Turizm Ve Diş Ticaret Limited şirketi.
