= Korucu, Dargeçit =

Village in Mardin Province, Turkey

Korucu
- Neighbourhood
- Location in Turkey
- Coordinates: 37.588°N 41.704°E
- Country: Turkey
- Province: Mardin
- District: Dargeçit
- Population (2021): 15
- Time zone: UTC+3 (TRT)

Korucu (Kurdish: Şikeftika) is a neighbourhood in the municipality and district of Dargeçit, Mardin Province in Turkey. The village is populated by Kurds of the Basiqil tribe and had a population of 15 in 2021.
