= Belen, Dargeçit =

Village in Mardin Province, Turkey

Belen
- Neighbourhood
- Location in Turkey
- Coordinates: 37.418°N 41.845°E
- Country: Turkey
- Province: Mardin
- District: Dargeçit
- Population (2021): 69
- Time zone: UTC+3 (TRT)

Belen (Kurdish: Bakvan) is a neighbourhood in the municipality and district of Dargeçit, Mardin Province, Turkey. The village is populated by Kurds of the Elîkan tribe and had a population of 69 in 2021.
