= Altıyol, Dargeçit =

Village in Mardin Province, Turkey

Altıyol
- Neighbourhood
- Location in Turkey
- Coordinates: 37.539°N 41.603°E
- Country: Turkey
- Province: Mardin
- District: Dargeçit
- Population (2021): 599
- Time zone: UTC+3 (TRT)

Altıyol (Kurdish: Serdef) is a neighbourhood in the municipality and district of Dargeçit, Mardin Province in Turkey. The village is populated by Kurds of the Elîkan tribe and had a population of 599 in 2021.
