= Masʿūd II of Ṭur ʿAbdin =

15th century Syriac Orthodox monk

Masʿūd Zazoyo or Masʿūd of Zaz (c.1430/31 – 1509/1512) was a Syriac Orthodox author, hermit, monk and prelate.

== Life ==
Masʿūd became the abbot of the Dayr al-Ṣalīb (Monastery of the Cross) around 1462/63. He left the monastery in 1480/81 to become bishop of Ḥesno d'Kifo and the Monastery of Mor Quryaqos. As bishop he took the name Basil. In 1492 he became the Patriarch of Ṭur ʿAbdin (as Masʿūd II) and by tradition took the throne name Ignatius. As patriarch he promoted monasticism in the Ṭur ʿAbdin.

Masʿūd was not a popular patriarch. He caused confusion by appointing a maphrian, Baselios Malki of Midyat, and twelve new bishops for the Ṭur ʿAbdin, provoking some leading bishops to denounce him. According to Afram Barsoum, they denounced him to the Patriarch of Antioch, the head of the Syriac Orthodox church, but according to the anonymous continuator of the Ecclesiastical History of Bar Hebraeus, they denounced him to the secular Islamic authority, the emir of Ḥesno d'Kifo. As a result, Masʿūd was forced into retirement. According to the continuator, he was even confined to a monastery. He abdicated and ordered his supporters not to elect a new patriarch, but before the end of his life he had regained the exercise of his patriarchal functions.

Some sources have him dying in 1509, others reigning as patriarch down to 1512. The identification of the abbot, bishop and writer with the patriarch was first made by Afram Barsoum in the 20th century.

== Works ==
Only one work by Masʿūd has survived, the Elpo ruḥonoyto or The Spiritual Boat. An extended poem in dodecasyllabic metre, it is a guide for monks and hermits seeking the "haven of impassibility". It is a mystical tract in three sections devoted to the Trinity, Christology and the spiritual gifts given by Christ to both angels and humans. The last section is based on the Pseudo-Dionysian Celestial Hierarchy.

The life of Masʿūd Zazoyo before he was ordained a bishop in 1480/81 is recorded in a short biographical notice written by his disciple ʿAziz and included in the oldest manuscript of Masʿūd's Spiritual Boat, now kept in Baghdad. According to this notice, Masʿūd wrote other works, but these have not survived.

== Sources ==
- Barsoum, Ephrem (2008). The History of Tur Abdin. Translated by Matti Moosa. Gorgias Press.
- Burleson, Samuel; Van Rompay, Lucas (2018) [2011]. "List of Patriarchs: II. The Syriac Orthodox Church and its Uniate Continuations". In Sebastian P. Brock; Aaron M. Butts; George A. Kiraz; Lucas Van Rompay (eds.). Gorgias Encyclopedic Dictionary of the Syriac Heritage: Electronic Edition. Beth Mardutho [Gorgias Press].
- Kiraz, George A. (2018) [2011]. "Maphrian". In Sebastian P. Brock; Aaron M. Butts; George A. Kiraz; Lucas Van Rompay (eds.). Gorgias Encyclopedic Dictionary of the Syriac Heritage: Electronic Edition. Beth Mardutho [Gorgias Press].
- Teule, Herman G. B. (2018) [2011]. "Masʿūd of Ṭur ʿAbdin". In Sebastian P. Brock; Aaron M. Butts; George A. Kiraz; Lucas Van Rompay (eds.). Gorgias Encyclopedic Dictionary of the Syriac Heritage: Electronic Edition. Beth Mardutho [Gorgias Press].
