= Akyol, Dargeçit =

Village in Mardin Province, Turkey

Akyol
- Neighbourhood
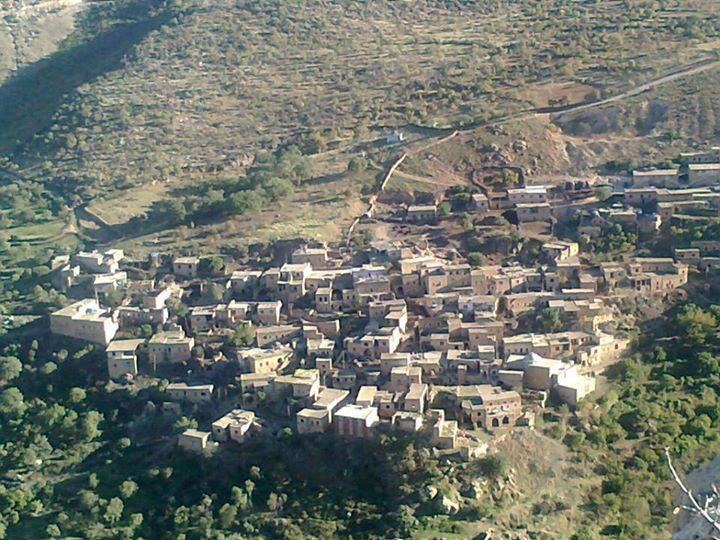

- Location within Turkey
- Coordinates: 37.627°N 41.750°E
- Country: Turkey
- Province: Mardin
- District: Dargeçit
- Population (2021): 115
- Time zone: UTC+3 (TRT)

Akyol (Kurdish: Derêca) is a neighbourhood in the municipality and district of Dargeçit, Mardin Province, in Turkey. The village is populated by Kurds of the Erebiyan tribe and had a population of 115 in 2021.
