= Karabayır, Dargeçit =

Village in Mardin Province, Turkey

Karabayır
- Neighbourhood
- Location in Turkey
- Coordinates: 37.565°N 41.817°E
- Country: Turkey
- Province: Mardin
- District: Dargeçit
- Population (2021): 1,020
- Time zone: UTC+3 (TRT)

Karabayır (Kurdish: Zengan; Syriac: Zangan) is a neighbourhood in the municipality and district of Dargeçit, Mardin Province in Turkey. The village is populated by Kurds of the Erebiyan tribe and had a population of 1,020 in 2021.

== History ==
Zangan (today called Karabayır) was historically inhabited by Syriac Orthodox Christians. In 1915, there were 30 Syriac families. Amidst the Sayfo, the Syriacs were killed by the Ali Rammo tribe.

== Bibliography ==
- Courtois, Sébastien de (2004). The Forgotten Genocide: Eastern Christians, The Last Arameans. Translated by Vincent Aurora. Gorgias Press.
- Gaunt, David (2006). Massacres, Resistance, Protectors: Muslim-Christian Relations in Eastern Anatolia during World War I. Gorgias Press.
- Jongerden, Joost; Verheij, Jelle, eds. (2012). Social Relations in Ottoman Diyarbekir, 1870-1915. Brill.
- Tan, Altan (2018). Turabidin'den Berriye'ye. Aşiretler - Dinler - Diller - Kültürler (in Turkish). p. 112. ISBN 9789944360944.
