= Çavuşlu, Dargeçit =

Village in Mardin Province, Turkey

Çavuşlu
- Neighbourhood
- Location in Turkey
- Coordinates: 37.647°N 41.800°E
- Country: Turkey
- Province: Mardin
- District: Dargeçit
- Population (2021): 26
- Time zone: UTC+3 (TRT)

Çavuşlu (Kurdish: Zêwikê) is a neighbourhood in the municipality and district of Dargeçit, Mardin Province in Turkey. The village is populated by Kurds of the Erebiyan tribe and had a population of 26 in 2021.
