= Tavşanlı, Dargeçit =

Village in Mardin Province, Turkey

Tavşanlı
- Neighbourhood
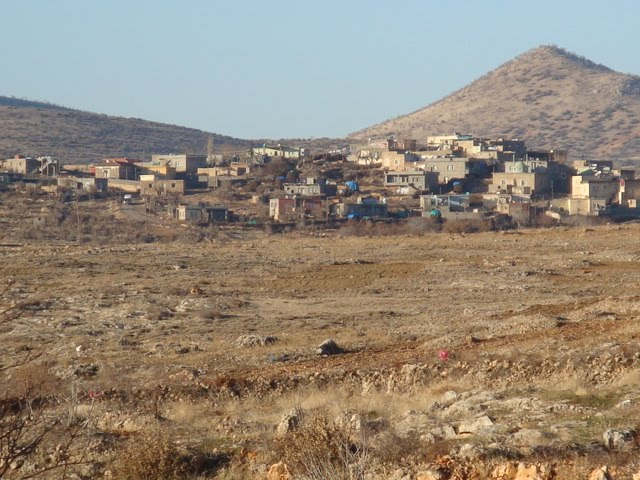

- Location within Turkey
- Coordinates: 37.50°N 41.582°E
- Country: Turkey
- Province: Mardin
- District: Dargeçit
- Population (2021): 207
- Time zone: UTC+3 (TRT)

Tavşanlı (Kurdish: Xirabê Qesrê) is a neighbourhood in the municipality and district of Dargeçit, Mardin Province in Turkey. The village is populated by Kurds of the Elîkan tribe and had a population of 207 in 2021.
