= Gürışık, Dargeçit =

Village in Mardin Province, Turkey

Gürışık
- Neighbourhood
- Location in Turkey
- Coordinates: 37.527°N 41.607°E
- Country: Turkey
- Province: Mardin
- District: Dargeçit
- Population (2021): 416
- Time zone: UTC+3 (TRT)

Gürışık (Kurdish: Gundê Xace) is a neighbourhood in the municipality and district of Dargeçit, Mardin Province in Turkey. The village is populated by Kurds of the Elîkan tribe and had a population of 416 in 2021.
