= Tanyeri, Dargeçit =

Village in Mardin Province, Turkey

Tanyeri
- Neighbourhood
- Location in Turkey
- Coordinates: 37.457°N 41.686°E
- Country: Turkey
- Province: Mardin
- District: Dargeçit
- Population (2021): 47
- Time zone: UTC+3 (TRT)

Tanyeri (Kurdish: Rover) is a neighbourhood in the municipality and district of Dargeçit, Mardin Province in Turkey. The village is populated by Kurds of the Elîkan and Zaxuran tribes and had a population of 47 in 2021.
