= Yoncalı, Dargeçit =

Village in Mardin Province, Turkey

Yoncalı
- Neighbourhood
- Location in Turkey
- Coordinates: 37.590°N 41.859°E
- Country: Turkey
- Province: Mardin
- District: Dargeçit
- Population (2021): 1,104
- Time zone: UTC+3 (TRT)

Yoncalı (Kurdish: Zivinga Çelik) is a neighbourhood in the municipality and district of Dargeçit, Mardin Province in Turkey. The village is populated by Kurds of the Erebiyan tribe and had a population of 1,104 in 2021.
