= Çukurdere, Dargeçit =

Village in Mardin Province, Turkey

Çukurdere
- Neighbourhood
- Location in Turkey
- Coordinates: 37.450°N 41.803°E
- Country: Turkey
- Province: Mardin
- District: Dargeçit
- Population (2021): 71
- Time zone: UTC+3 (TRT)

Çukurdere (Kurdish: Gelîkur) is a neighbourhood in the municipality and district of Dargeçit, Mardin Province in Turkey. The village is populated by Kurds of the Elîkan and Omerkan tribes and had a population of 71 in 2021.
