= Dargeçit =

Town in Mardin Province, Turkey

- District and municipality
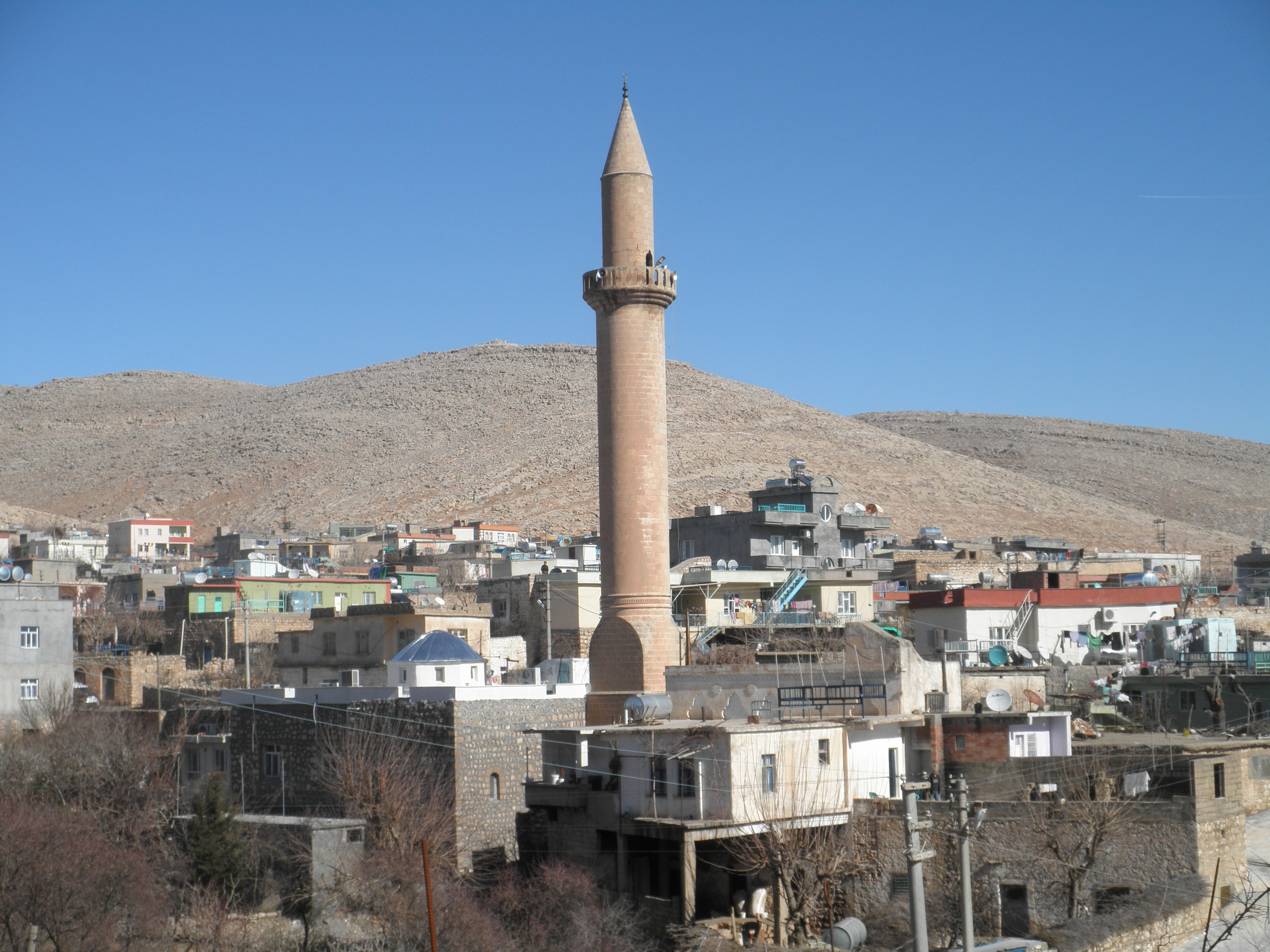

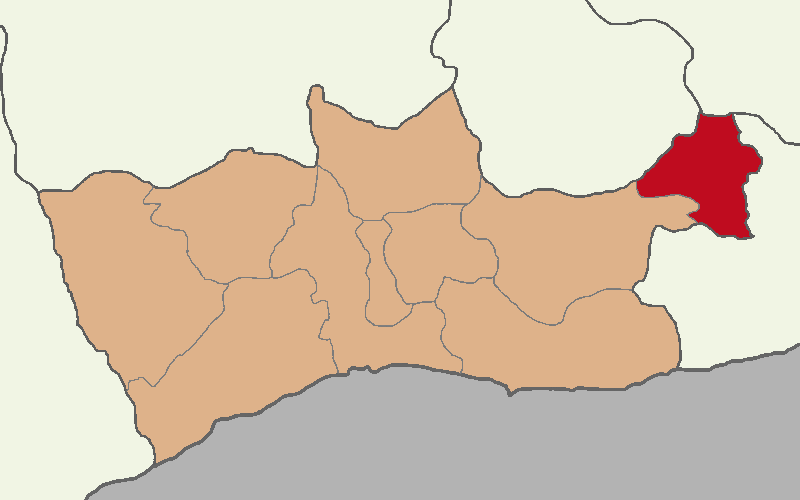
- Map showing Dargeçit District in Mardin Province

- Location within Turkey
- Coordinates: 37.544°N 41.720°E
- Country: Turkey
- Province: Mardin
- Area: 519 km^{2} (200 sq mi)
- Elevation: 940 m (3,080 ft)
- Population (2022): 27,147
  - Density: 52.3/km^{2} (135/sq mi)
- Time zone: UTC+3 (TRT)
- Area code: 0482

Dargeçit (Arabic: كربوران, Kurdish: Kerboran, Syriac: ܟܦܪܒܘܪܐܢ, romanized: Karburan) (Note: Alternatively transliterated as Kafarbūrān, Kafar Boran, Kärbōrān, Karbūrān, Karboran, Karkh Buran, Keferboran, Kerburân, Kerburan, Kfar-Boran’da, Kfar-Boran, Kfarbūrān, Kferburan, or Kırbüran. Nisba: Kärbōrānī.) is a municipality and district of Mardin Province, Turkey. Its area is 519 km^{2}, and its population is 27,147 (2022). The town is principally populated by Kurds of the Erebiyan tribe. It is located in the historic region of Tur Abdin.

== Etymology ==
The Kurdish and Syriac names of the village are derived from "kfar" ("village" in Syriac) and "buron" ("fallow land" in Syriac).

== History ==
There was a Church of the East monastery of Mar Shallīṭā, located on the west bank of the Tigris near Karburan (today called Dargeçit), which was last mentioned in the eleventh century. A community of adherents of the Church of the East is known to have existed at Karburan from the scribe and deacon Masʿūd, who copied a manuscript there in 1429/1430 (AG 1741). At the beginning of the 18th century, some Syriac Orthodox families at Karburan converted to Catholicism under the influence of French missionaries. It was recorded by the priest Yuhanna of Basibrina from the Qardash family that Karburan was set on fire by an emir called Bidayn in 1714. According to oral tradition, in the 1750s, the Christians of Karburan placed themselves under the protection of the Erebi tribe to protect themselves from bandits and Kurds in neighbouring villages.

A number of Syriac Orthodox families in the village converted to Protestantism upon the arrival of English and American missionaries in the region in the 1830s and the establishment of a Protestant mission at Mardin in 1858. Some Syriac Orthodox families at Karburan joined the Syriac Catholic Church in the 1850s. Muhammad Beg was killed at Karburan by Yezdanşêr and Musawwar Beg during their revolt in 1855. In the Syriac Orthodox patriarchal register of dues of 1870, it was recorded that Karburan had 96 households, who paid 324 dues, and it was served by the Church of Morī Qūryāqūs and four priests. Following the arrival of the American missionary Caleb Frank Gates at Mardin in 1880, Syriac Protestants in the village appealed to him to establish a Protestant church at Karburan. However, opposition to the construction of a Syriac Protestant church in the village from the Syriac Orthodox villagers led to a raid on the house of the leader of Protestants, in which the leader's son was killed and 200 sheep were stolen. Despite this, a Syriac Protestant church was later built at Karburan.

There were 300 Syriac, Armenian, and Kurdish families at Karburan in 1900. In 1914, Karburan was inhabited by 2000 Syriacs, according to the list presented to the Paris Peace Conference by the Assyro-Chaldean delegation. In 1915, the village was populated by 500 Christian families, including Syriacs and Armenians, and 60 Muslim families. The Syriac population was divided between Syriac Orthodox Christians, Syriac Catholics, and Syriac Protestants. There were more than 350 Syriac Orthodox families. Twelve Syriac priests, one monk, and Mor Antimos Ya’qub of Esfes, the Syriac Orthodox bishop of Dayro da-Slibo, resided at Karburan. At this time, the village was one of the largest and richest villages in Tur Abdin and acted as a commercial and craftwork centre due to its many water mills.

Amidst the Sayfo, in 1915, survivors of massacres in neighbouring villages fled to Karburan and informed the villagers of their plight. A council held by the Syriac notables was unable to agree upon a course of action and Mor Antimos Ya’qub was taken to the town hall by the Turkish mudir (village-level government official), where he eventually converted to Islam, believing that this would spare him. The Syriacs were consequently forced to barricade themselves in seven large building complexes, popularly known as the "seven palaces", after coming under attack from Kurds led by Ömar and Mustafa, the sons of Ali Ramo. Some Syriacs who agreed to leave the buildings after having received assurances from the Turkish mudir were taken to the town hall and killed whereas another group that refused to leave their building was attacked by the Turkish gendarmes and massacred.

The Syriac villagers managed to hold off the Turkish troops for four days until they ran out of ammunition and thus their building complexes were stormed one by one and, after each building was captured, the Turkish troops took the captive Syriacs outside and killed them in front of the other defenders. Mor Antimos Ya’qub, despite his conversion to Islam, was seized by Mustafa ibn Ali Ramo and was tortured on the roof of a building and either had his throat slit or he threw himself from the roof. The bodies were then collected and burned on a large fire. The French Armenian historian Raymond Kévorkian notes that 600 Syriacs were able to flee whilst the British historian David Gaunt attests that about 100 Syriacs from Karburan survived. Some Syriacs survived as they had fled to Hah whereas others had been away from Karburan when the massacres took place, and some children were kept as servants in Muslim households.

In the aftermath of the Sayfo, the Syriacs of Karburan largely adopted the Kurdish language as their mother tongue, whilst only a few continued to speak Syriac. The population was 1285 in 1960. In 1966, 875 Kurdish-speaking Christians in 150 families inhabited Karburan. In 1970, Karburan was inhabited by 2000 people, of whom two thirds were Syriacs. From 1970 onwards, as a result of the Kurdish–Turkish conflict, the Syriacs of Karburan were forced to emigrate to Sweden, particularly the city of Västerås, Germany, and Belgium to escape the violent living conditions and thus the population dropped from about 300 families in 1975 to only 20 families in 1976. By 1978, there were 16 Syriac families. Andreas (Endravos) Demir, the Christian mayor of Karburan, was killed by Kurds on 29 October 1978. The final Syriac family left Karburan in 1979. The village's name was consequently changed to Dargeçit by the Turkish government. The Church of Mar Cyriacus, which had been abandoned after the departure of the village's Syriac population, was later confiscated by the state treasury. The Church of Mor Kuraykos was renovated by Syriacs in the diaspora whilst the Syriac Catholic and Syriac Protestant churches remain abandoned. From the summer and autumn of 2015, Kurdistan Workers' Party (PKK) militants fought against the Turkish government at Dargeçit until they were defeated in April 2016.

== Government ==
The district of Dargeçit was established in 1987. Dargeçit gained the status of town in 1989. Since the 2013 administrative reform, Dargeçit is a metropolitan district and municipality. Prior to the reform, the district comprised the main town of Dargeçit (four neighbourhoods: Bahçebaşı, Safa, Saray and Tepebaşı), two towns (Kılavuz and Sümer), thirty-six villages and twenty-six hamlets.

There are 41 neighbourhoods in Dargeçit District:

- Akçaköy (Îzar)
- Akyol (Derêca)
- Alayunt (Arbayê)
- Altınoluk (Gera Cafer)
- Altıyol (Serdef)
- Bağözü (Trîwa)
- Bahçebaşı
- Batur (Batêr)
- Baysun (Êzdîna)
- Beğendi (Gizre)
- Belen (Bakvan)
- Bostanlı (Wersikê)
- Çatalan (Deyrik)
- Çatalçam (Dayro da-Slibo)
- Çavuşlu (Zêwkê)
- Çelikköy (Çêlik)
- Çukurdere (Gelîkur)
- Değerli (Îwan)
- Gürgen (Botijê)
- Gürışık (Gundê Xace)
- Ilısu (Germav)
- Karabayır (Zengan)
- Kartalkaya (Lîyan)
- Kılavuz (Xelilan)
- Kısmetli (Basiqil kêvil)
- Korucu (Şikeftika)
- Kumdere (Şibêbiyê)
- Kuşluca (Kopraz)
- Ormaniçi (Qawaqa)
- Safa
- Saray
- Suçatı (Kerbent)
- Sümer (Deywan)
- Tanyeri (Rover)
- Tavşanlı (Xirabê Qesrê)
- Temelli (Emara)
- Tepebaşı
- Ulaş (Dîlan)
- Yanılmaz (Guriza)
- Yılmaz (Mêranê)
- Yoncalı (Zivinga Çelik)

== Notable people ==
- Julius Abd al-Ahad Antar (r. 1882–1885), Syriac Orthodox bishop of the Monastery of the Cross.
- Yusuf Çetin (b. 1954), Syriac Orthodox metropolitan and patriarchal vicar
- Fuat Deniz (1967–2007), Assyrian-Swedish sociologist and writer

== Bibliography ==
- Aras, Ramazan (2005). Migration and Memory: Assyrian Identity in Mardin Kerboran/Dargeçit (Master of Arts in History thesis). Boğaziçi University.
- Atto, Naures (2011). Hostages in the Homeland, Orphans in the Diaspora: Identity Discourses Among the Assyrian/Syriac Elites in the European Diaspora (PDF). Leiden University Press.
- Avcıkıran, Adem (2009). Kürtçe Anamnez, Anamneza bi Kurmancî.
- Barsoum, Aphrem (2003). The Scattered Pearls: A History of Syriac Literature and Sciences. Translated by Matti Moosa (2nd ed.). Gorgias Press.
- Barsoum, Aphrem (2008). The History of Tur Abdin. Translated by Matti Moosa. Gorgias Press.
- Bcheiry, Iskandar (2009). The Syriac Orthodox Patriarchal Register of Dues of 1870: An Unpublished Historical Document from the Late Ottoman Period. Gorgias Press.
- Carlson, Thomas A. (2018). Christianity in Fifteenth-Century Iraq (PDF). Cambridge University Press.
- Courtois, Sébastien de (2004). The Forgotten Genocide: Eastern Christians, The Last Arameans. Translated by Vincent Aurora. Gorgias Press.
- Courtois, Sébastien de (2013). "Tur Abdin : Réflexions sur l'état présent descommunautés syriaques du Sud-Est de la Turquie, mémoire, exils, retours". Cahier du Gremmamo (in French). 21: 113–150.
- Dinno, Khalid S. (2017). The Syrian Orthodox Christians in the Late Ottoman Period and Beyond: Crisis then Revival. Gorgias Press.
- Gaunt, David (2006). Massacres, Resistance, Protectors: Muslim-Christian Relations in Eastern Anatolia during World War I. Gorgias Press.
- Jongerden, Joost; Verheij, Jelle, eds. (2012). Social Relations in Ottoman Diyarbekir, 1870-1915. Brill.
- Keser Kayaalp, Elif (2021). Church Architecture of Late Antique Northern Mesopotamia.
- Kévorkian, Raymond (2011). The Armenian Genocide: A Complete History.
- Palmer, Andrew (1990). Monk and Mason on the Tigris Frontier: The Early History of Tur Abdin. Cambridge University Press.
- Ritter, Hellmut (1967). Turoyo: Die Volkssprache der Syrischen Christen des Tur 'Abdin (in German). Vol. 1. Franz Steiner Verlag.
- Takahashi, Hidemi (2011). "al-Ṣalīb, Dayr". Gorgias Encyclopedic Dictionary of the Syriac Heritage: Electronic Edition. Gorgias Press.
- Tan, Altan (2018). Turabidin'den Berriye'ye. Aşiretler - Dinler - Diller - Kültürler (in Turkish). Pak Ajans Yayincilik Turizm Ve Diş Ticaret Limited şirketi. ISBN 9789944360944.
- Tozman, Markus (2012). "Cadastral Registration of Lands and Preservation Orders in Turkey's South-East: Subtle Forms of Discrimination?". In Pieter Omtzigt; Markus K. Tozman; Andrea Tyndall (eds.). The Slow Disappearance of the Syriacs from Turkey and of the Grounds of the Mor Gabriel Monastery (PDF). LIT Verlag Münster. pp. 139–156.
- Travis, Hannibal, ed. (2018). The Assyrian Genocide: Cultural and Political Legacies (PDF). Routledge.
- Wilmshurst, David (2000). The Ecclesiastical Organisation of the Church of the East, 1318–1913 (PDF). Peeters Publishers.
- Woźniak-Bobińska, Marta (2020) [2018]. Modern Assyrian/Syriac Diaspora in Sweden. Translated by Marta Malina Moraczewska. University of Lodz.
- Yacoub, Joseph (2016). Year of the Sword: The Assyrian Christian Genocide, A History. Translated by James Ferguson. Oxford University Press.
- Yeğen, Mesut (2021). "State Violence in 'Kurdistan'". In Stephan H. Astourian; Raymond H. Kévorkian (eds.). Collective and State Violence in Turkey: The Construction of a National Identity from Empire to Nation-State. Berghahn Books. pp. 303–346.
