= Kartalkaya, Dargeçit =

Village in Mardin Province, Turkey

Kartalkaya
- Neighbourhood
- Location in Turkey
- Coordinates: 37.562°N 41.878°E
- Country: Turkey
- Province: Mardin
- District: Dargeçit
- Population (2021): 116
- Time zone: UTC+3 (TRT)

Kartalkaya (Kurdish: Lîyan) is a neighbourhood in the municipality and district of Dargeçit, Mardin Province in Turkey. The village is populated by Kurds of the Erebiyan tribe and had a population of 116 in 2021.
