= Sümer, Dargeçit =

Village in Mardin Province, Turkey

Sümer
- Neighbourhood
- Location in Turkey
- Coordinates: 37.542°N 41.652°E
- Country: Turkey
- Province: Mardin
- District: Dargeçit
- Population (2022): 1,430
- Time zone: UTC+3 (TRT)

Sümer (Kurdish: Deywan) is a neighbourhood of the municipality and district of Dargeçit, Mardin Province, Turkey. Its population is 1,430 (2022). Before the 2013 reorganisation, it was a town (belde). It is populated by Kurds of the Erebiyan tribe.
