= Ayrancı, Beşiri =

Village in Batman Province, Turkey

Ayrancı
- Village
- Location within Turkey
- Coordinates: 37.880°N 41.281°E
- Country: Turkey
- Province: Batman
- District: Beşiri
- Population (2021): 351
- Time zone: UTC+3 (TRT)

Ayrancı (Arabic: دير مار قرياقس; Kurdish: Dêra Kira; Syriac: ܕܝܪܐ ܕܡܪܝ ܩܘܪܝܐܩܘܣ, lit. 'Monastery of Mor Quryaqos') (Note: Also known as Dayr al-Qira, Dayr Morī Quryāqūs, Deir el Qira, Deir Mar Quriaqos, Deir Mor Quryaqos, Dera Kera, Dirakira, Mar Quryaqos’ Monastery, the Monastery of Quryaqos, the Monastery of Mar Cyriacus, the Monastery of Mor Quryakos, the Monastery of Mar Quryaqos, the Monastery of Mār Quriāqōs, or the Monastery of Mar Quriaqos. It was alternatively known as Black Monastery as it was located near the Black Rock (Karataş).) is a village in the Beşiri District of Batman Province in Turkey. The village is populated by Kurds of the Sinikan tribe and had a population of 351 in 2021.

== History ==
The Monastery of Mor Quryaqos (today called Ayrancı) was established in the 5th century. It is first attested in 1415 in which year Basilius, metropolitan of Zarjal, was ordained by Patriarch Yeshu’ I of Tur Abdin. The monastery served as the episcopal seat of the Syriac Orthodox diocese of Zarjal from the beginning of the 15th century until the beginning of the 20th century. It was renovated in 1481, at which time the monastery had 100 monks, as per a colophon written there in 1483. According to colophons dated to 1486 and 1488, there were many monks from Tur Abdin at the monastery.

Patriarch Ignatius Shukrallah II aided Basilius Gurgis of Aleppo, metropolitan of Diyarbakr, in construction at the monastery in 1723. Ignatius Shukrallah II obtained a certificate of investiture from Sultan Ahmed III dated 6 Rabi’ al-Akhir 1135 AH/1723 AD addressed to the Muslim judge of Hisn Kipha so to exempt the monastery from fees and tithes. The portico in the monastery was added in 1855. Elias (later Patriarch Ignatius Elias III) was appointed as head of the monastery in 1895. Elias provided refuge to approximately 7000 Armenians at the monastery amidst the massacres in the Diyarbekir Vilayet. In 1909, an additional structure was added to the monastery according to a Garshuni inscription on the portal on the south side of the monastery. The monastery was abandoned in the early 1940s. It was restored in 2020–2025.

== Bibliography ==
- Barsoum, Aphrem (2003). The Scattered Pearls: A History of Syriac Literature and Sciences. Translated by Matti Moosa (2nd ed.). Gorgias Press.
- Barsoum, Aphrem (2008). The History of Tur Abdin. Translated by Matti Moosa. Gorgias Press.
- Barsoum, Aphrem (2009). History of the Syriac Dioceses. Vol. 1. Translated by Matti Moosa. Gorgias Press.
- Bcheiry, Iskandar (2013). The Account of the Syriac Orthodox Patriarch Yūḥanun Bar Šay Allāh (1483–1492): The Syriac Manuscript of Cambridge: DD.3.8(1). Gorgias Press.
- Bell, Gertrude (1982). The Churches and Monasteries of the Ṭur ʻAbdin. Pindar Press.
- Dinno, Khalid S. (2017). The Syrian Orthodox Christians in the Late Ottoman Period and Beyond: Crisis then Revival. Gorgias Press.
- Erdal, Zekai (January 2022). "Monastery of Mor Quryakos/ Dayr al-Qira". In Keser-Kayaalp, Elif (ed.). Syriac Architectural Heritage at Risk in TurʿAbdin (PDF). pp. 47–51.
- Gaunt, David (2006). Massacres, Resistance, Protectors: Muslim-Christian Relations in Eastern Anatolia during World War I. Gorgias Press.
- Wilmshurst, David (2000). The Ecclesiastical Organisation of the Church of the East, 1318–1913 (PDF). Peeters Publishers.
