= Patriarch of Tur Abdin =

Office of the Syriac Orthodox Church from 1364 to 1816

From 1364 to 1816 the region of Tur Abdin constituted a distinct patriarchate within the Syriac Orthodox Church, with the following patriarchs:

- Ignatius Saba of Salah (1364–1389)
- Ignatius Isho' of Midhyat (1389–1418), died 1421
- Ignatius Mas'ud of Salah (1418–1420)
- Ignatius Henoch of 'Ayn Ward (1421–1444)
- Ignatius Qoma of Ba Sabrina (1444–1454)
- Ignatius Isho' of Salah (1455–1460)
- Ignatius 'Aziz (Philoxene) of Basila (1460–1482)
- Ignatius Saba of Arbo (1482–1488)
- Ignatius John Qofer of 'Ayn Ward (1489–1492)
- Ignatius Mas'ud of Zaz (1492–1512)
- Ignatius Isho' of Zaz (1515–1524)
- Ignatius Simon of Hattakh (1524–1551)
- Ignatius Jacob of Hisn (1551–1571)
- Ignatius Sahdo of Midhyat (1584–1621)
- Ignatius 'Abd Allah of Midhyat (1628–?)
- Ignatius Habib of Midhyat (1674–1707)
- Ignatius Denha of 'Arnas (1707–1725)
- Ignatius Barsum of Midhyat (1740–1791)
- Ignatius Aho and Ignatius Isaiah of Arbo (1791–1816), jointly

Between 1804 and c. 1840 there was a series of patriarchs of contested and limited authority:

- Severus Isḥoq (1804–1816)
- Yawsep of ʿArnas (1805–1834)
- Barṣawmo of Ḥbob (1816–1839)
- Mirza of Beth Sbirina (1816–1842)
- Barṣawmo of Beth Sbirina (1821–1842)
- Grigorios Zaytun Ghalma of Midyat (1821–1844)
- Severus ʿAbd al-Nūr of Arbo (1834–1839)

== See also ==
- List of Syriac Orthodox Patriarchs of Antioch
- List of Syriac Catholic Patriarchs of Antioch
- Maphrian
- Catholicose of the East
