= Yezdanşêr =

Kurdish military leader

Yezdanşêr was a Kurdish leader, military officer and a relative of Bedir Khan Beg. He became shortly the Müteselim of Cizre and later led a revolt against the Ottoman Empire in the mid 1850s. After the revolt failed, he was exiled to Vidin, returning to the Ottoman bureaucracy in 1860s.

== Early life ==
Yezdanşêr was born to Mir Sevdin (or Seyfeddin), a former Mir of Bohtan. Yezdanşêr was also the grandson of Bedir Khan Beg's uncle and a commander of Bedir Khan's troops during his revolt against the Ottoman Empire in 1847. He then betrayed Bedir Khan and guided the Ottoman forces towards their decisive victory over Bedir Khan Beg. In exchange for his services, Yezdanşêr was promised some position in the Ottoman bureaucracy and after the defeat of his relative he was appointed the Mütesellim of Cizre in the Kurdistan Eyalet. He was soon replaced by an Ottoman Kaymakam, sent to Constantinople in March 1849 the same year then also to Mosul. He was prohibited to return to Cizre.

== Revolt against the Ottoman Empire ==
Disappointed from this treatment he led a revolt which began during the Crimean War, maybe in late 1854, which was when his salary was cut. In January 1855 Yezdanşêr denied having rebelled and offered a relative from him as a hostage. He also put forward several demands towards the Ottomans such as the permission for his family from Mosul to join him in Cizre which should be put under his administration or the release of prisoners in Cizre and Midyat. Not satisfied with the Ottoman response, he conquered Bitlis and raided Midyat. The raid on Midyat was unsuccessful, as after they destroyed the Christian church, the Ottomans came to rescue the town and made many prisoners. Officials of the British Empire were worried the Ottomans would deviate troops fighting in the Crimean war to suppress Yezdanşêr's revolt and tried to mend ties between the two parties. The British General Fenwick Williams advised Yezdanşêr not to attack an Army of three states and eventually, the British compelled Yezdanşêr to surrender together with his brother and take refuge in the British Consulate in Mosul. Having arrived in Mosul, the Ottoman officials attempted to apprehend him, which the French prevented. Yezdanşêr and his allies remained in Mosul until September 1855, when they were escorted to Constantinople over Diyarbakir. Without a leader, the revolt dispersed. Arriving in Istanbul, the rebels were arrested and subsequently exiled to Vidin without the knowledge of the British. Lord Stratford, British consul in Constantinople protested his exile demanding his return to Constantinople, but to no avail.

== In exile and later life ==
Yezdanşêr then escaped to Ottoman Bosnia in early 1858 but was captured and brought back to Vidin the same year. His family was allowed to join him the next year. In the mid 1860s he applied to the Ottoman bureaucracy, eventually becoming the Governor of Adlyie and in 1868 a Mutassarif in the Janina vilayet. It is assumed he died somewhen in the 1870s.
