= Anıtlı, Midyat =

Village in Mardin Province, Turkey

Anıtlı
- Neighbourhood
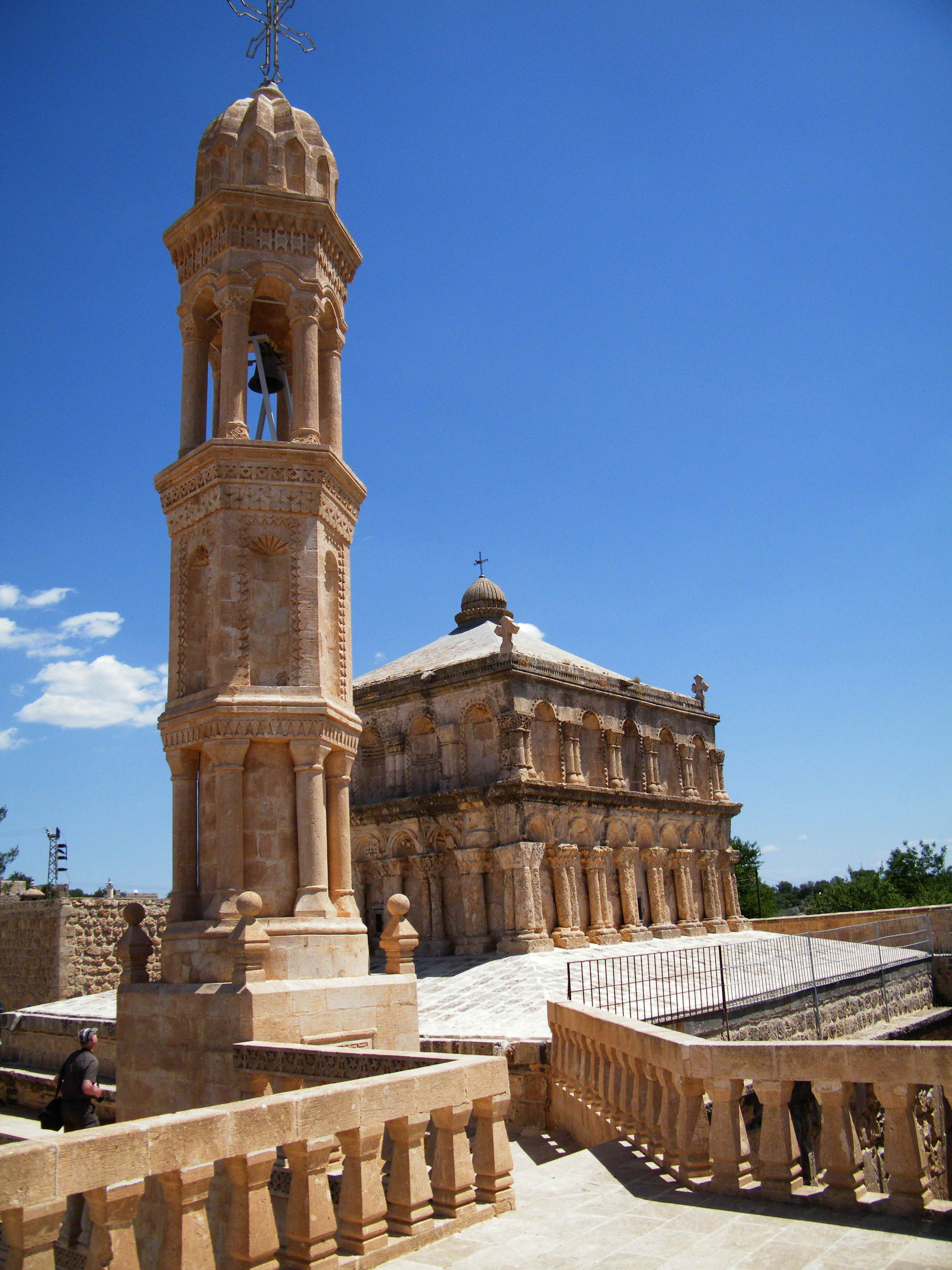
- The Church of the Virgin Mary in Hah

- Location within Turkey
- Coordinates: 37°28′37″N 41°36′38″E
- Country: Turkey
- Province: Mardin
- District: Midyat

Government
  - Mayor: Habib Dogan
- Population (2024): 165
- Time zone: UTC+3 (TRT)

Anıtlı, also known by its Syriac name Ḥāḥ, (Syriac: ܚܐܚ, romanized: Ḥāḥ) is a neighbourhood in the municipality and district of Midyat, Mardin Province in Turkey. It is located in the historical region of Tur Abdin, and remains populated by Assyrians/Syriacs (Note: The terms "Assyrian" and "Syriac" are used to refer to the same people) who belong to the Syriac Orthodox Church.

In the village, there are churches of Mor Sobo and Yoldath Aloho (the Virgin Mary). The churches were reportedly destroyed by Timur in the 14th century, and their remains survive to this day. The village maintains a unique structure that combines religious and civil structures with self-sufficient systems and agriculture.

== Etymology ==
The name for the village translates to "monument", or "village of the monuments".

== History ==
Ḥāḥ (today called Anıtlı) lies near the Tigris, bordered by Habsnas, Hatlib, and Zaz, within a region historically two-thirds Christian. Located 30 km southwest of Dayro da'Slibo and northeast of Midyat, amid settlements like Boqusyono and Estrako. Andrew Palmer suggests that Khabkhi, in whose territory Zaz was located, corresponds to the region of Ḥāḥ. The village traces its origins back to ancient Assyria, with tablets dating back to the 9th century BC suggesting that the village was located in Assyrian territory. The village was also a place for trade, with many staying overnight as part of a road starting in Iran; the early vitality of the village is believed to be due to trade across the Tigris River.

In the fourth century, Roman-Persian conflicts shaped Tur Abdin, with Ḥāḥ in a salient beyond the Nymphios River after the 363 CE treaty, while Hesno d-Kifo, capital of Arzanene under Constantius II, lost territory post-363, its bishop at Chalcedon in 451. Ḥāḥ's Church of Mor Sobo, possibly fifth-century, defied Persian Zoroastrianism. By the fifth century, Ḥāḥ, potentially Tur Abdin's first bishopric, saw Bishop Ammi martyred in Tanezin, its eight churches peaking with the Church of the Mother of God and a Mor Samuel chapel from Samuel of Nyohto's visit, while Thomas the Ascetic (d. 486) exemplified its monasticism.

In the sixth century, Ḥāḥ's Yoldath Aloho church, among Tur Abdin's oldest, served as a bishopric seat until 613 CE, shifting to Qartmin Abbey (614–1088) from 615. In 774, the Monastery of the Cross in Ḥāḥ suffered many losses from a plague, alongside the deaths of 95 monks at Beth Kustan. Ezekiel I of Ḥāḥ (818–824) attended a meeting in al-Raqqa, followed by Ezekiel II (892–904). In 1088/9, a Persian raid led to a diocesan split, restoring Ḥāḥ as a cathedral village, with the Monastery of the Cross as its episcopal see from 1089 to 1873. Ḥāḥ was a bishopric again from the eleventh to thirteenth centuries, its Great Church of Mor Sobo the cathedral. In 1124, priest Abu Sahl was murdered by Muslims; by 1136, Mor Sobo's oratory bore inscriptions (1135–1295). Iywannis Musa, who graduated from the Mor Hananyo Monastery, was formerly bishop of Ḥāḥ. (Note: Many bishops of Tur Abdin were originally from Ḥāḥ) In 1454 AD, the village fell under attack from Ottoman Turks alongside several other villages in the Tur Abdin region, with many men suffocating to death by smoke. In the late 18th century, bishops from Tur Abdin appointed the maphrian Abd Allah of Ḥāḥ, though the death of Ignatius Barsawmo of Midyat created conflict amongst them.

According to the Syriac Orthodox Patriarchal register of dues from 1870, 200 households owed dues, of which 49 had already paid. These dues were designated for the Yoldath Aloho Church or Mor Sobo, served by the priests Abuna Aho and Abuna Gawriyyeh.

In Ḥāḥ there stood a large, old building known as King Yuhanon’s palace, surrounded by high walls, behind which the Assyrians/Syriacs took shelter during Sayfo. At the start of the massacres, about 100 Assyrian/Syriac families were living in the village. The village leader, Rasho, went north into the Armenian areas to witness the events firsthand and confirmed the reports of atrocities committed against the Armenians. When he returned, the Assyrians/Syriacs began to prepare for their defense—they reinforced the walls, built barricades, and gathered food and water. People from nearby villages began to arrive, and at the peak, around 2,000 individuals were behind the walls, including 200 armed men. Before the assault began, a local Kurdish chief named Hajo, from the Kurtak clan, came to warn them of the approaching danger, telling them that the authorities would likely prevent him from offering protection. Hajo managed to escort the villagers of Beth Kustan and Dayro d'Qube to Ḥāḥ. Other Assyrians/Syriacs sought refuge in the village from places such as Kerburan and Shehirkan during the genocide.

In mid-August, Kurdish tribesmen, along with some Turkish soldiers, surrounded the village, and the fighting continued without pause, day and night, and a siege lasting 45 days was imposed on Ḥāḥ. Shaykh Fathullah, the Mhallami religious leader, who had previously negotiated a ceasefire at ‘Ayn-Wardo, later came to Ḥāḥ and arranged a similar agreement there as well.

On 29 November, 1993, the mayor of Ḥāḥ was assassinated, as part of a series of 30 murders against Assyrians/Syriacs in Tur Abdin between 1990 and 1994. A year later, the only Christian doctor in Midyat was also murdered. The perpetrators of the murders were never charged. Human rights violations such as land grabbing were common in Ḥāḥ and other villages in Tur Abdin during this period. Between 1997 and 1999, it was reported that the village had no monk since 1985. In 1995, the village was transferred from Dargeçit to Midyat District, alongside Zaz.

In 2005, Ḥāḥ and Beth Sbirino were the only two villages in the Tur Abdin region that still had military presence. In May 2016, a car bomb attack was carried out on the village's police station by PKK militants, resulting in three injuries. In 2021, the Churches of Mor Sobo and Yoldath Aloho were included in the tentative list of UNESCO World Heritage, alongside seven other churches and monasteries. The decision was announced by the Turkish Ministry of Culture and Tourism, and had been submitted in April of that year. In 2022, Ḥāḥ was included as part of the United Nations World Tourism Organization's Upgrade Programme, a decision that was met with warm reception from the village's people. In 2025, the village was selected as one of the best tourism villages as part of the UN Tourism Initiative, having been previously described as one of the Tur Abdin region's three most beautiful villages by a Turkish news outlet.

== Churches ==
=== Church of the Virgin Mary (Yoldath Aloho) ===
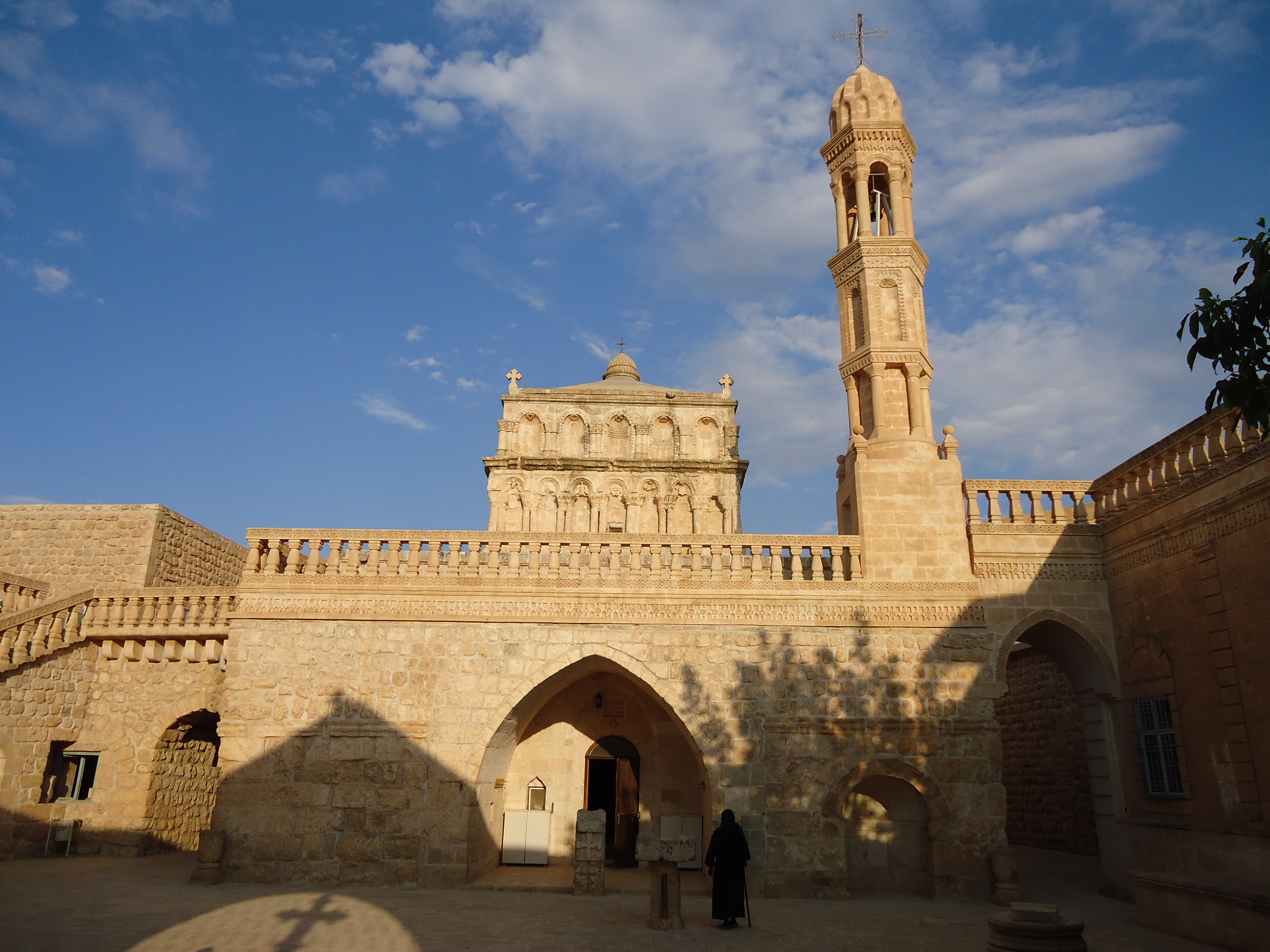
Church of the Virgin Mary in Anıtlı.

The Church of The Virgin Mary, or Yoldath Aloho, is believed to have been built around 450 AD, and expanded by Byzantian emperor Justinian I in the following century. Architectural and religious data posits that the church was built on the foundations of a pagan temple, and that it is the only extant Syriac church from the 1st to 2nd centuries. Andrew Palmer suggests that the size of the original settlement of the church strongly indicates that it was where the first bishopric of Tur Abdin was located, whose name was 'Ammi.

While historians tie the church's origins to the mid-5th century, local legend posits the placement of the church to the very birth of Christ. According to the story, twelve wise men, also known as the Magi, gathered in Ḥāḥ on their journey to find the newborn Christ, guided by the star. Three of them continued on to Bethlehem, while the other nine remained in Ḥāḥ. In gratitude for the gifts they brought—gold, frankincense, and myrrh—the Virgin Mary, the mother of God, gave the three wise men a piece of the swaddling cloth that had wrapped the infant Jesus. When the three reunited with the others in Ḥāḥ, they decided to burn it and share the ashes, but instead, the cloth transformed into twelve medallions. In awe of this miracle, the twelve Wise Men built a monument to the Virgin Mary, later becoming the Church of the Mother of God (Yoldath Aloho). Each man contributed a layer of stone, and the monument was later converted into a church with the arrival of Christianity.

The church is divided into three sections: a sacred area, the nave and the narthex: the nave of the church is unique in that it contains influences unlike other churches in the region. The architecture of the church contains a cloister dome (believed to trace back to the 6th century) and shares similarities with Armenian and Georgian architecture, with local influences embedded (as well as those from pagan temples). The church had additions made to its architecture as late as the 20th century, particularly to meet the worshipping needs of the villagers. Gertrude Bell described the church as the "crowning glory of Tur Abdin", and it is the only active place of worship in the village. The Assyrian nationalist figure Naum Faiq was a student in the church's school, established by the Ancient Assyrian Brotherhood in the 19th century. Assyrians/Syriacs organize the Shahro ceremony every year at the church, in commemoration of the death of the Virgin Mary.

The church was registered by the Diyarbekir Cultural Heritage Protection Regional Board in 2001. As a result of the 2016 PKK attack in the village, the structure of the church was left damaged, with the doors and windows having been blown out.

=== Mor Sobo ===
The Church of Mor Sobo is the largest church in Ḥāḥ and is believed to originate from the 5th century. On the north side of the church is a small chapel dedicated to "Mor Samuel", aligning with the story of the Life of Samuel where the inhabitants built a monastery in the name of the Persian prince Sovo (who was martyred for his Christian faith). The church was destroyed by Timur in the 14th century, and it is not clear when it was originally built. Architectural evidence suggests that the church was built during the 6th century, having had major renovations in the 8th century after a series of earthquakes. Before its destruction, it was the largest church in Tur Abdin, acting as a prototype for other churches to follow from.

=== Others ===
Other Syriac Christian establishments in Ḥāḥ include the Monastery of Mar Sarjis, the Monastery of Mort Maryam Magdloyto, and the Monastery of Mor Yuhannon (Palmer suggests that the monastery was also dedicated to the Virgin Mary). Gertrude Bell had taken notes on Mort Maryam Magdloyto, but they were never published. The monastery is linked to the 7th and 8th centuries due to the presence of a winged palmette ornament, which was traced back to the Umayyad Caliphate.

== Demography ==
Ḥāḥ had a population of 165 in 2024. They traditionally spoke Kurdish but Turoyo language has since become more prominent amongst young people. A number of villagers emigrated abroad to Germany and France in the late 20th century.

=== Families ===
The following is a list of the number of Syriac families that have inhabited Ḥāḥ per year stated. Unless otherwise stated, all figures are from the list provided in Eastern Christianity, Theological Reflection on Religion, Culture, and Politics in the Holy Land and Christian Encounter with Islam and the Muslim World, as noted in the bibliography below. (Note: The size of a single family varies between five and ten persons.)

- 1966: 73
- 1978: 67
- 1979: 55
- 1981: 52
- 1987: 42
- 1995: 19
- 1997: 18
- 2013: 17-18

=== Population ===
Historical population
Year	Pop.	±% p.a.
1997	125	—
2007	122	−0.24%
2012	150	+4.22%
2017	130	−2.82%
2022	159	+4.11%
2024	165	+1.87%
Source: Population census (1997) and TÜİK (2007-2024)

== Bibliography ==
- Aslan, Leyla; Binan, Can Şakir (30 September 2024). "Mardi̇n Mi̇dyat Anitli (Hah) Köyü Meryem Ana Manastiri'nin Mi̇marlik Tari̇hi̇ ve Mi̇mari̇ Koruma Ara Kesi̇ti̇nde İncelenmesi̇". The Journal of Academic Social Science Studies. 17 (101): 193–216. doi:10.29228/JASSS.75819.
- Barsoum, Aphrem (2003). The Scattered Pearls: A History of Syriac Literature and Sciences. Translated by Matti Moosa (2nd ed.). Gorgias Press.
- Barsoum, Aphrem (2008a). History of the Za'faran Monastery. Translated by Matti Moosa. Gorgias Press.
- Barsoum, Aphrem (2008b). The History of Tur Abdin. Translated by Matti Moosa. Gorgias Press.
- Bcheiry, Iskandar (2009). The Syriac Orthodox Patriarchal Register of Dues of 1870: An Unpublished Historical Document from the Late Ottoman Period. Gorgias Press.
- Brock, Sebastian (2021). "The Syrian Orthodox Church in the twentieth century". Eastern Christianity, Theological Reflection on Religion, Culture, and Politics in the Holy Land and Christian Encounter with Islam and the Muslim World (PDF). Living Stones of the Holy Land Trust. pp. 155–181.
- Courtois, Sébastien de (2013). "Tur Abdin : Réflexions sur l'état présent descommunautés syriaques du Sud-Est de la Turquie,mémoire, exils, retours". Cahier du Gremmamo (in French). 21: 113–150.
- Gaunt, David (2006). Massacres, Resistance, Protectors: Muslim-Christian Relations in Eastern Anatolia during World War I. Gorgias Press.
- Günaysu, Ayşe (2019). Safety Of The Life Of Nun Verde Gökmen In The Village Zaz (Izbirak) — Midyat, Tur Abdin – And The General Social Situation Of The Assyrian Villages In The Region (PDF) (Report). Translated by Abdulmesih BarAbraham. Human Rights Association Commission Against Racism and Discrimination.
- Güsten, Susanne (August 2016). A Farewell to Tur Abdin (PDF) (Report). Istanbul Policy Center.
- Keser-Kayaalp, Elif, ed. (January 2022). Syriac Architectural Heritage at Risk in TurʿAbdin (PDF).
- Jongerden, Joost; Verheij, Jelle (2012). Social Relations in Ottoman Diyarbekir, 1870-1915. Brill.
- Palmer, Andrew (1990). Monk and Mason on the Tigris Frontier: The Early History of Tur Abdin. Cambridge University Press.
- Sinclair, T. A. (1989), Eastern Turkey: An Architectural and Archaeological Survey, vol. III, London: The Pindar Press
- Ritter, Hellmut (1967). Turoyo: Die Volkssprache der Syrischen Christen des Tur 'Abdin (in German). Vol. 1. Franz Steiner Verlag.
- Tan, Altan (2018). Turabidin'den Berriye'ye. Aşiretler - Dinler - Diller - Kültürler (in Turkish). Pak Ajans Yayincilik Turizm Ve Diş Ticaret Limited şirketi. ISBN 9789944360944.
