= Shamoun Hanne Haydo =

Syriac/Assyrian leader (1870–1964)

- ܫܶܡܥܘܢ ܚܰܢܢܶܐ ܚܰܝܕܐ
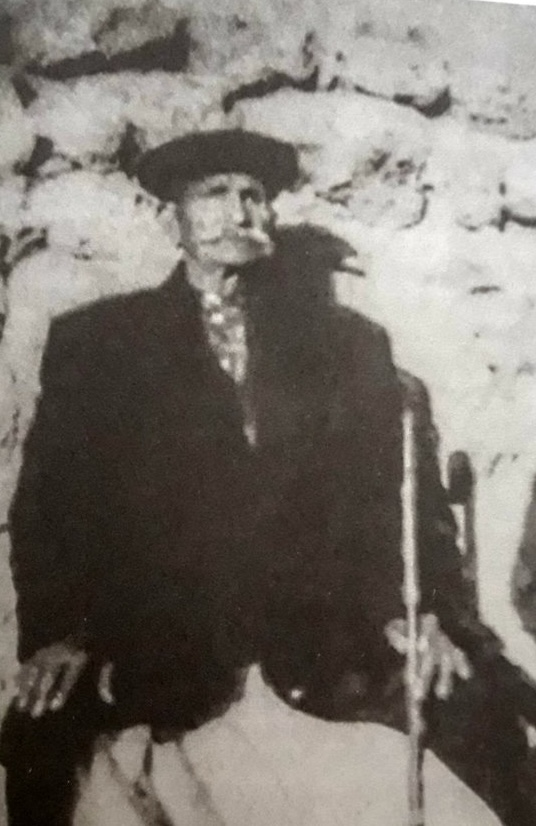
- Last known photo of Haydo
- Born: 1870; Sare, Ottoman Empire
- Died: 1964 (aged 94); Beth Sbirino, Turkey
- Known for: Defending villages during the Sayfo
- Relatives: Melke Hanne Haydo (brother)

Shamoun Hanne Haydo (Syriac: ܫܶܡܥܘܢ ܚܰܢܢܶܐ ܚܰܝܕܐ) (1874 – 1964), also spelled Şemun Hanne Haydo, was a Syriac/Assyrian community leader from the village of Sare, Tur Abdin. Born to the Haydo family, which held important positions in the Heverkan clan, he was exposed to violence that impacted his family from a young age. After returning from college, he fought back against a Kurdish chief that controlled the livelihood of his village, cementing his fame as a warrior.

A respected intellectual and figure of authority, Haydo is best known for his leadership during the early 20th century, particularly in defending Syriac/Assyrian communities during the Sayfo. During World War I, he was arrested along with several Kurdish aghas, and after escaping, reasserted his individual authority and the authority of the Heverkan clan in the region. He lived the rest of his life in Tur Abdin until his passing in 1964.

Today, Haydo is considered to be a legendary warrior among the Syriac/Assyrian community, and is an important leader in the oral testimony of the Tur Abdin region. After his passing, oral memory of his leadership was preserved through dengbêj songs. In recent years, commemorations to Haydo have taken place through memorials and commemorations, as well as the production of a biography by Turkish author Kemal Yalçın.

== Early life ==
Shamoun Hanne Haydo was born in 1870 to a Syriac/Assyrian family in the village of Sare near Midyat in the Tur Abdin region. From the 1700s onward, the Haydo family produced prominent leaders in the Sare–Bsorino region of Tur Abdin who worked to protect Syriacs/Assyrians. In Tur Abdin, Christian families were split between seeking protection from the pro-government Dekşuri clan north of Midyat, or the anti-government Heverkan clan in the south. Both clans were characterized under the concept of a confederation and high ethnic/religious diversity which included Kurds, Arabs, Assyrians/Syriacs, Muslims, Christians, Yazidis, and even those in the same eşîret. The Haydo family was the most influential Christian family in the Heverkan clan, which left them vulnerable to conflicts due to rivalries in the region.

During the Massacres of Bedir Khan, Bsorino and Sare were attacked from Kurdish invasions, and security further diminished. Haydo's father, a leader in the Syriac/Assyrian villages, prioritized efforts to ensure security by uniting the dominant tribes of the region. During the occupation of Dayro d'Slibo, Haydo's father liberated the monastery from Ottoman forces and Kurdish participants. He was blamed for the deaths of Ottoman soldiers, and raids were launched to catch him, resulting in the deaths of many Syriacs/Assyrians and his wife (Haydo's mother) Besse. He would later be arrested by Ottoman authorities, which greatly impacted Haydo's life.

Between 1888 and 1894, Haydo and his brother Melke studied at the American College in Mardin. He was fluent in seven languages (English, German, Arabic, Ottoman Turkish, Turkish, Kurdish, and Syriac), and was the only person from the Mardin-Midyat region to have attended the college. Turkish author Kemal Yalçın states that Haydo was one of the most intellectual figures among the Syriacs/Assyrians, and worked for a time as a teacher.

Prior to 1890, local gendarmes hunting for Haydo's father committed a massacre against 38 villagers, seizing livestock and money while burning village crops. The villagers were forced to pay protection money to the Kurdish chief who shot Haydo's father, but after 10 years, they refused. Haydo, returning from college, desired to reassert familial rule over the villages. They were attacked by a large number of gunmen, but the Syriacs/Assyrians retaliated and killed many Kurds, cementing Shamoun's fame. Eventually, he succeeded in uniting his own tribe with the Syriacs/Assyrians of Sare, Bsorino, and neighboring villages, becoming their leader.

== Leadership during Sayfo ==
Following political developments through English and Turkish sources, Haydo foresaw that the Ottoman administration, after its defeat in the 1912 Balkan War, would seek revenge on non-Muslims, including Syriacs/Assyrians. He anticipated that an even larger massacre might follow the atrocities of 1895–96 and the 1909 Adana massacres. With this in mind, he began working to unify the Syriac/Assyrian people, holding meetings with tribal leaders and representatives of influential families to prepare for the danger he believed was coming. Haydo, along with Alike Batte, united tribes by threatening to become enemies with the tribes that didn't accept peace.

Compared to Assyrian/Syriac Safar family, Haydo became a hero for the Heverkan clan, and was so close to the tribal chiefs that he was arrested together with them. In July 1913, Haydo and four Kurdish aghas—Çelebi Agha, Alike Batte Agha, Haco Agha, and Serhan Agha—were arrested by Ottoman soldiers in Tur Abdin and were chained by the neck and feet and forced to walk from Midyat to Mardin. The purpose of these arrests was to weaken anti-government activity in Tur Abdin, and was justified by claiming Çelebi Agha as responsible for the unsolved murders of a group of Yazidis. Yalçın stated his belief that had these aghas and Haydo not been arrested, the violence of Sayfo may have been reduced.

After Haydo's arrest, leadership passed to his brother Melke, whereby he established contact with Syriac/Assyrian fighters and leaders in Aynwardo, Hah, Hazak, Dayro d-Slibo, Zaz, and the Mor Melke Monastery, and gathered Syriacs/Assyrians from 18 surrounding villages into Bsorino. Between 1915 and 1916, Melke was able to save the lives of around 5,000 Syriacs/Assyrians, but in June 1917, he was killed in an ambush in Bsorino. In November 1917, Haydo escaped from Harput Prison together with Alike Batte and returned to Sare.

Following Haydo's escape from prison, him and Alike Batte were set on restoring their influence over Tur Abdin. An arrest warrant was issued for Haydo and soldiers went to Sare. A raid was carried out, but when soldiers came across Haydo, they did not immediately recognize him. Haydo invited the soldiers into his house and offered them hospitality. After their rest, a soldier asked where Haydo could be found, to which Haydo responded that he was in fact the person they were looking for. The commander was reluctant to arrest him, and so the group left the village without taking Haydo. Haydo and Batte's influence over Tur Abdin was restored following a clash between the Dekşuri and Heverkan clans in Nusaybin, where the Heverkan repelled forces from the Dekşuri clan.

== Personal life and death ==
Throughout his life, Haydo witnessed the deaths of many of his family members, often in broad daylight and surrounded by family. These included his grandfather Haydo, his parents, his uncle Yawse, brother Malke, and his brother-in-law Gewriye. Haydo would eventually come to father four sons and four daughters.

In 1919, after the genocide, Haydo retreated to his village and continued life as a normal farmer. After a meeting with Turkish Prime Minister İsmet İnönü, Haydo was given a lifetime permit to carry weapons. He would lead the villages of Sare and Bsorino from 1900 until his death. In 1925, he was arrested alongside Çelebi Agha in Gaziantep and wouldn't be released until 1930.

Haydo passed away in 1964 at the age of 94; although some sources stated he fled to Syria and passed away there, close family members stated that he spent his entire life in Sare, with his grave in the village cemetery.

== Legacy ==
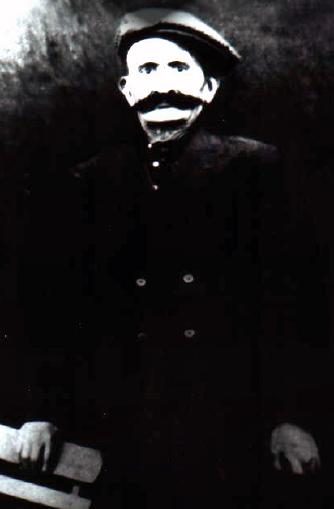
Haydo standing beside a chair

Haydo is considered to be a legendary warrior among the Syriac/Assyrian community, and is remembered for his role in saving many Syriacs/Assyrians from death in the Tur Abdin region. According to oral testimony, Haydo is recounted for several of his personality traits, including his intelligence, peace-making abilities, and his commitment as a tribal warrior. A large segment of the Syriac/Assyrian population believe that Haydo held a divine power that allowed him to survive conflict and confront up to 20 men at a time. Despite his recent history, Haydo earned a privileged place among the Syriac/Assyrian people (as well as Kurds), and stories about his life and legacy were preserved through dengbêj songs. Among the Syriacs/Assyrians in the diaspora, the presence of Haydo in Assyrian folk-pop music has allowed them to maintain a connection to the homeland and Tur Abdin.

A 600+ page book about Haydo's life and legacy was written and published by Turkish author Kemal Yalçın around 2020. The book was also translated into several other languages, namely English, German, Dutch, and Surayt. The book was translated into Surayt by Assyrian author Jan Beth-Sawoce, and was presented at a ceremony in Gronau. The book is part of a growing memorialization of Haydo and his legacy in commemorations of Sayfo, such as in 2019, and has received positive attention from the community.

The following year, in 2024, a memorial was built for Haydo in Tur Abdin. In the same year, a documentary film was prepared to commemorate the 150th anniversary of his birth. The documentary aired in November of that year in Enschede, and the event was broadcast by numerous TV broadcasters.

== Bibliography ==
- Çelik, Adnan (July–September 2022). "États, tribus, islam: Les Hebizbinî et l'engagement tribal dans l'islam radical au Kurdistan de Turquie" [States, tribes, Islam: The Hebizbinî and tribal involvement in radical Islam in Turkish Kurdistan]. Archives de sciences sociales des religions (in French). 67 (199): 93–120. doi:10.4000/assr.67174. JSTOR 27338759 – via JSTOR.
- Gaunt, David (2006). Massacres, Resistance, Protectors: Muslim-Christian Relations in Eastern Anatolia during World War I. Gorgias Press.
- Gaunt, David (August 2020). "When Perpetual Persecution Becomes Ottoman Genocide". Bustan: The Middle East Book Review. 11 (1). Södertörn University: 1–19. doi:10.5325/bustan.11.1.0001. JSTOR 10.5325/bustan.11.1.0001 – via JSTOR.
- Gaunt, David (November 1, 2020). "The Long Assyrian Genocide". In Astourian, Stephan; Kévorkian, Raymond (eds.). Collective and State Violence in Turkey: The Construction of a National Identity from Empire to Nation-State. Berghahn Books. p. 85. ISBN 978-1-78920-451-3.
- Kardaş, Canser (March 2011). Doru, Nesim (ed.). Halk Kahramanı Bağlamında Semune Hanne Haydo [Şemune Hanne Haydo in the Context of a Folk Hero]. International Symposium on Idil from Past to Present (in Turkish). Şırnak University. pp. 389–398.
- Sims, Michael (2023). ‘Without a Purpose, Misfortune Will Befall Our Land:’ Discourses of Nation in Late Ottoman Kurdistan (PhD thesis). University of Washington. Archived from the original on 6 December 2025.
