= Gedik =

Gedik may refer to:

== People ==
- Gedik Ahmed Pasha (1482), Ottoman statesman and admiral
- Kazim Gedik (born 1938), Turkish wrestler
- Namık Gedik (1911–1960), Turkish physician and politician
- Ömür Gedik (born 1970), Turkish journalist

== Places ==
- Gədik, a former village in Quba Rayon, Azerbaijan
- Gedik, Bayramiç, a village in Çanakkale Province, Turkey
- Gedik, Göle, a village in Ardahan Province, Turkey
- Gedik, Haymana, a neighbourhood in Ankara Province, Turkey
- Gedik, İdil, a village in Şırnak Province, Turkey
- Gedik, Nazilli, a neighbourhood in Aydın Province, Turkey
- Gedik, Oğuzeli, a village in Gaziantep Province, Turkey
- Gedik, Serik, a neighbourhood in Antalya Province, Turkey
