= Fırat, İdil =

Village in Şırnak Province, Turkey

Fırat
- Neighbourhood
- Location in Turkey
- Coordinates: 37.34028°N 42.02083°E
- Country: Turkey
- Province: Şırnak
- District: İdil
- Time zone: UTC+3 (TRT)

Fırat (Kurdish: Deştadarê) (Note: Also known as Dashta-Dere, Dachte-Dare, or Deştadarı.) is a neighbourhood in the İdil District of Şırnak Province in Turkey. It is populated by Kurds of the Dudêran and Kiçan tribes.

== History ==
Dashta-Dere (today called Fırat) was historically inhabited by Syriac Orthodox Christians. It was located in the Cizre kaza in the Mardin sanjak in the Diyarbekir vilayet in c. 1900. It was populated by 100 Syriacs in 1914, according to the list presented to the Paris Peace Conference by the Assyro-Chaldean delegation. Amidst the Sayfo, all of the 20 Syriac families who inhabited the village were killed. Kurds occupied the village, where they kept a number of Christians hostages. Syriacs from Azakh attacked the Kurds at Dashta-Dere in October 1915 in order to release the hostages.

== Bibliography ==
- Baz, Ibrahim (2016). Şırnak aşiretleri ve kültürü (in Turkish). ISBN 9786058849631.
- Gaunt, David (2006). Massacres, Resistance, Protectors: Muslim-Christian Relations in Eastern Anatolia during World War I. Gorgias Press.
- Jongerden, Joost; Verheij, Jelle, eds. (2012). Social Relations in Ottoman Diyarbekir, 1870-1915. Brill.
