= Uçarlı, İdil =

Village in Şırnak Province, Turkey

Uçarlı
- Village
- Location within Turkey
- Coordinates: 37.301°N 41.710°E
- Country: Turkey
- Province: Şırnak
- District: İdil
- Population (2021): 314
- Time zone: UTC+3 (TRT)

Uçarlı (Arabic: تمرس; Kurdish: Temerz; (Note: Also spelt as Temerzê.) Syriac: ܬܡܪܙ, romanized: Tamars) (Note: Alternatively transliterated as Tämmärz, Tamarz, Tamarzé, Tamarzī, Tamers, Tamziri, or Temerzi. Nisba: Tämmärzī.) is a village in the İdil District of Şırnak Province in Turkey. The village is populated by Kurds of the Domanan tribe and had a population of 314 in 2021. It is located in the historic region of Tur Abdin.

== History ==
Tamars (today called Uçarlı) was historically inhabited by adherents of the Church of the East. Prior to the 18th century, the Church of St. Abba Sallara at Tamars, which had originally belonged to the Church of the East, came under the control of the Syriac Orthodox Church following the conversion of some of the villagers. There was also a Syriac Orthodox Church of the Loaf. Adherents of the Church of the East at Tamars converted to the Chaldean Catholic Church in the 19th century. In the Syriac Orthodox patriarchal register of dues of 1870, it was recorded that the village had 19 households, who paid 69 dues, and it did not have a church or a priest.

In 1914, it was populated by 120 Syriacs, according to the list presented to the Paris Peace Conference by the Assyro-Chaldean delegation. In 1915, there were 20 Syriac families. It served as the residence of the Kurdish chief Muhamma ‘Alo and his clan who belonged to the Haverkan confederation. It was located in the kaza of Midyat. Amidst the Sayfo, upon hearing of the attack on the neighbouring village of Midun, the Syriacs of Tamars were escorted to safety at Beth Sbirino by Muhamma ‘Alo. The village had a population of 147 in 1960. There were 26 Turoyo-speaking Christians in five families at Tamars in 1966. By 1987, there were no remaining Syriacs.

== Demography ==
The following is a list of the number of Syriac families that have inhabited Tamars per year stated. Unless otherwise stated, all figures are from the list provided in The Syrian Orthodox Christians in the Late Ottoman Period and Beyond: Crisis then Revival, as noted in the bibliography below.

- 1915: 20
- 1966: 5
- 1978: 4
- 1979: 2
- 1987: 0

== Bibliography ==
- Al-Jeloo, Nicholas (2015). "Transferrable Religious Heritage: Church Buildings in Northern Mesopotamia". Le patrimoine architectural de l'Église orthodoxe d'Antioche: Perspectives comparatives avec les autres groupes religieux du Moyen-Orient et des régions limitrophes. Publications of the University of Balamand. pp. 111–127.
- Barsoum, Aphrem (2003). The Scattered Pearls: A History of Syriac Literature and Sciences. Translated by Matti Moosa (2nd ed.). Gorgias Press.
- Barsoum, Aphrem (2008). The History of Tur Abdin. Translated by Matti Moosa. Gorgias Press.
- Baz, Ibrahim (2016). Şırnak aşiretleri ve kültürü (in Turkish). ISBN 9786058849631.
- Bcheiry, Iskandar (2009). The Syriac Orthodox Patriarchal Register of Dues of 1870: An Unpublished Historical Document from the Late Ottoman Period. Gorgias Press.
- Biner, Zerrin Özlem (2020). States of Dispossession: Violence and Precarious Coexistence in Southeast Turkey. University of Pennsylvania Press.
- Courtois, Sébastien de (2004). The Forgotten Genocide: Eastern Christians, The Last Arameans. Translated by Vincent Aurora. Gorgias Press.
- Dinno, Khalid S. (2017). The Syrian Orthodox Christians in the Late Ottoman Period and Beyond: Crisis then Revival. Gorgias Press.
- Gaunt, David (2006). Massacres, Resistance, Protectors: Muslim-Christian Relations in Eastern Anatolia during World War I. Gorgias Press.
- Jongerden, Joost; Verheij, Jelle, eds. (2012). Social Relations in Ottoman Diyarbekir, 1870-1915. Brill.
- Ritter, Hellmut (1967). Turoyo: Die Volkssprache der Syrischen Christen des Tur 'Abdin (in German). Vol. 1. Franz Steiner Verlag.
