= Akdağ (disambiguation) =

Akdağ is a mountain in Denizli and Afyon provinces, Turkey.

Akdağ may also refer to:

== People ==
- Cem Akdağ (born 1956), Turkish basketball coach
- Erol Can Akdağ, (born 1996), Turkish footballer
- İbrahim Akdağ (born 1991), Turkish footballer
- Meryem Akdağ or Akda (born 1992), Turkish runner of Kenyan descent
- Recep Akdağ (born 1960), Turkish physician and politicianTarık Langat Akdağ
- Tarık Langat Akdağ (born 1988), Turkish long-distance runner
- Ümit Akdağ (born 2003), Romanian footballer of Turkish descent
- Vehbi Akdağ (1949–2020), Turkish wrestler

== Places ==
- Akdağ, a mountain in Sivas Province, Turkey
- Akdağ, Aziziye, a neighbourhood in Erzurum Province, Turkey
- Akdağ, İdil, a village in Şırnak Province, Turkey
- Akdağ, Simav, a town in Kütahya Province, Turkey
