= Sırtköy, İdil =

Municipality in Şırnak Province, Turkey

Sırtköy
- Municipality
- Location in Turkey
- Coordinates: 37.374°N 42.033°E
- Country: Turkey
- Province: Şırnak
- District: İdil
- Population (2021): 2,305
- Time zone: UTC+3 (TRT)

Sırtköy (Kurdish: Tilêla) is a town (belde) in the İdil District of Şırnak Province in Turkey. It is populated by Kurds of the Dudêran, Kiçan and Meman tribes and had a population of 2,305 in 2021.

The neighborhoods are Dicle and Fırat.
