= Köyceğiz (disambiguation) =

Köyceğiz is a town and district of Muğla Province in the Aegean region of Turkey.

Köyceğiz may also refer to the following places in Turkey:

- Köyceğiz, Amasya, a village in Amasya Province
- Köyceğiz, Hayrat, a village in Trabzon, Black Sea Region
- Köyceğiz, İdil, a village in Şırnak Province
- Köyceğiz, Karayazı, a neighbourhood in Erzurum Province
- Lake Köyceğiz, an alluvial set lake in Muğla Province
