= Bozburun, İdil =

Village in Şırnak Province, Turkey

Bozburun
- Village
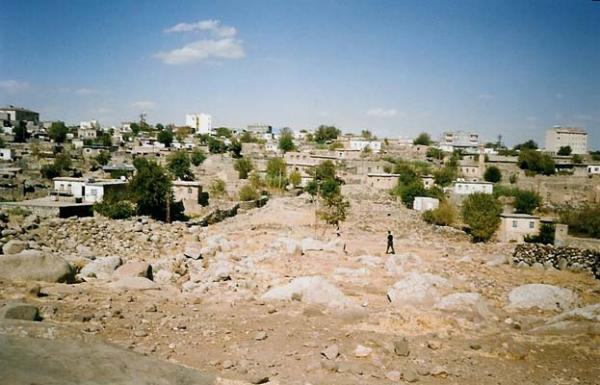
- Bozburun, İdil in 1999.

- Location within Turkey
- Coordinates: 37.283°N 41.765°E
- Country: Turkey
- Province: Şırnak
- District: İdil
- Population (2021): 129
- Time zone: UTC+3 (TRT)

Bozburun (Kurdish: Zinarex, Syriac: Zīnawraḥ) (Note: Alternatively transliterated as Zaynawrah, Zimmarih, Zinavrah, Zinnarih, Zinawrah, or Zenarek.) is a village in the İdil District of Şırnak Province in Turkey. The village is populated by Kurds of the Domanan tribe and had a population of 129 in 2021. It is located in the historic region of Tur Abdin.

== History ==
Zīnawraḥ (today called Bozburun) was historically inhabited by Syriac Orthodox Christians. In the Syriac Orthodox patriarchal register of dues of 1870, it was recorded that the village had 20 households, who paid 60 dues, and it did not have a church or a priest. In 1914, 120 Syriacs inhabited the village, according to the Assyro-Chaldean delegation to the Paris Peace Conference. There were 20 Syriac families in 1915. It was located in the kaza (district) of Midyat. It served as the residence of Musa Fatme, chief of the Dayran clan. Amidst the Sayfo, Musa Fatme gave asylum to 40 Syriac refugees and he and his family escorted them in two groups to safety at Beth Sbirino. By 1987, there were no remaining Syriacs.

== Bibliography ==
- Barsoum, Aphrem (2008). The History of Tur Abdin. Translated by Matti Moosa. Gorgias Press.
- Baz, Ibrahim (2016). Şırnak aşiretleri ve kültürü (in Turkish). ISBN 9786058849631.
- Bcheiry, Iskandar (2009). The Syriac Orthodox Patriarchal Register of Dues of 1870: An Unpublished Historical Document from the Late Ottoman Period. Gorgias Press.
- Courtois, Sébastien de (2004). The Forgotten Genocide: Eastern Christians, The Last Arameans. Translated by Vincent Aurora. Gorgias Press.
- Gaunt, David (2006). Massacres, Resistance, Protectors: Muslim-Christian Relations in Eastern Anatolia during World War I. Gorgias Press.
- Jongerden, Joost; Verheij, Jelle, eds. (2012). Social Relations in Ottoman Diyarbekir, 1870-1915. Brill.
