= Melke Hanne Haydo =

Syriac hero (1876–1917)

- ܡܰܠܟܐ ܚܰܢܢܶܐ ܚܰܝܕܐ
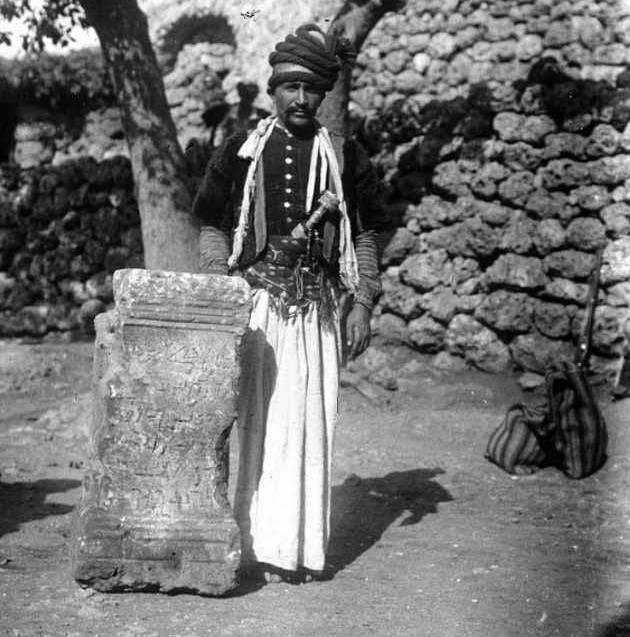
- A 1908 photograph of Haydo, rediscovered in 2023
- Born: 1876; Sare, Tur Abdin, Ottoman Empire
- Died: 1917 (aged 40–41)
- Relatives: Shamoun Hanne Haydo (brother)

Melke Hanne Haydo (Syriac: ܡܰܠܟܐ ܚܰܢܢܶܐ ܚܰܝܕܐ) (1876–1917) was a prominent Syriac leader of the Syriac Christian community in Basibrin. Known for his leadership during the Sayfo, Melke played a crucial role in organizing and defending his village and its people.

== Life ==
Melke Hanne Haydo was born in the village of Sare in Tur Abdin. He was the son of Hanne Haydo and the brother of Şemun Hanne Haydo. From 1888 to 1894, he studied at the Mardin American College alongside his brother. He became fluent in Syriac, English, German, Turkish, Ottoman Turkish, Arabic, and Kurdish. In 1913, after the arrest of his brother and four Kurdish chieftains, he assumed leadership of the Syriac community in Sare, Basibrin, and the surrounding villages.

In 1913, Melke began working to unite Syriac Christians across region, and by 1915, over 5,000 Syriacs from Sare and 18 surrounding villages in Tur Abdin had sought refuge in Basibrin. Gathering was largely a result of escalating violence and massacres in region, and Melke was selected as leader of defense. Under his leadership, community organized to protect themselves against attacks from local Kurdish tribes and Turkish forces.

Between 1915 and 1917, Basibrin was repeatedly attacked by Salihan Kurds and other Muslim Kurdish tribes. Melke, as head of defense, led several successful resistances against forces. He managed to keep villagers safe during attacks, showing resilience and strategic thinking. Melke's leadership, however, was not without internal challenges. Community faced divisions, particularly with Kamsho family, who opposed Melke's leadership due to his actions, such as seizing food supplies from friendly Kurds and Yezidis without paying and distributing stolen sheep unevenly. Tensions culminated in a split, with Kamsho family secretly contacting Salihan Kurds to have Melke removed from power. Despite Melke narrowly escaping trap and killing three members of Kamsho family in process, rift within village weakened collective defense.

In 1917, Turkish forces under command of Omer Naji Bey, along with Salihan Kurds, laid siege to Basibrin. Melke rejected Turkish ultimatum to surrender, leading to an intense battle. Syriacs initially mounted a successful counterattack and even pushed attackers outside village walls. However, Syriacs were eventually cut off from village, and many Syriacs were killed. Melke, continuing to lead his people, found himself in increasingly precarious circumstances. Attackers eventually retreated, but respite was short-lived. Turkish authorities, seeking revenge for seized rifles, targeted Melke.

In spring of 1917, Melke was captured and taken to Mor Dodo Church, which had been turned into a stronghold. He had previously killed a Turkish Jandarma sergeant who attempted to assault a Syriac woman, which led to a brutal retaliation. Turkish and Kurdish forces attacked Mor Dodo Church, setting it on fire by throwing burning dry grass onto roof. Melke sought refuge inside, but when doors finally opened, he was fatally stabbed by Imam Malla Taher, a Muslim friend of his. After Melke's death, attackers entered village, assuring Syriacs they would not be harmed if they left homes. Once Syriacs exited village, men were killed, and women and children were taken and distributed among attackers.

== Legacy ==
Following Melke's death, his brother Shemun Hanne Haydo, who had been imprisoned, escaped and reorganized remaining Syriac community. He successfully liberated Basibrin, rescuing many of kidnapped women and children.

In 2023, a historic photograph of Melke was rediscovered by a French researcher, Matin Damart, where it was then part of a handover ceremony. The photo of Melke was also discussed at a presentation in the Netherlands, with a speech delivered by Bishop Polycarpus Augin Aydin recounting the lives of him and his brother Shamoun.

== Bibliography ==
- Gaunt, David (2006). Massacres, Resistance, Protectors: Muslim-Christian Relations in Eastern Anatolia during World War I. Gorgias Press.
