= Kozluca =

Kozluca is a Turkish place name and it may refer to

- Kozluca, Burdur a town in the central district of Burdur Province
- Kozluca, Çorum
- Kozluca, Harmancık
- Kozluca, Hocalar a village in Hocalar district of Afyonkarahisar Province
- Kozluca, Hozat, a village in Tunceli Province
- Kozluca, İdil, a village in Şırnak Province
- Kozluca, İliç
- Kozluca, İnegöl
- Kozluca, Kars, a village in Kars Province
- Kozluca, Ovacık, a village in Tunceli Province
- Kozluca, Taşova a village in taşova district of Amasya Province
