= Yarbaşı, İdil =

Village in Şırnak Province, Turkey

Yarbaşı
- Village
- Location within Turkey
- Coordinates: 37.391°N 41.866°E
- Country: Turkey
- Province: Şırnak
- District: İdil
- Population (2021): 1,182
- Time zone: UTC+3 (TRT)

Yarbaşı (Note: "Precipice-head" in Turkish.) (Arabic: إِسفِس; Kurdish: Hespîst; (Note: Also spelt as Haspist, Hespest, Hespis, or Hespist.) Syriac: ܐܣܦܣ, romanized: Isfes) (Note: Alternatively transliterated as Espes, Esfes, Esfess, İsfis, or Isfis.) is a village in the İdil District of Şırnak Province in Turkey. The village is populated by Kurds of the Omerkan tribe and had a population of 1,182 in 2021. It is located in the historic region of Beth Zabday.

== History ==
Isfes (today called Yarbaşı) is identified with Hiaspis mentioned by the Roman historian Ammianus Marcellinus in Res gestae in the 4th century AD along the frontier with the Sasanian Empire. It was noted as the location of the defection of the protector domesticus Antoninus to the Sasanian Empire. The Syriac Orthodox maphrian Basil Solomon took refuge at Isfes after having fled Mosul in 1514 and remained there until his death in 1518.

An attack by Muhammad Pasha of Rawanduz on Isfes resulted in the death of 80 men, including a priest and a notable, and the enslavement of a number of women and children in early 1834. The village was part of the Syriac Orthodox diocese of Cizre in c. 1870. In the Syriac Orthodox patriarchal register of dues of 1870, it was recorded that the village had 72 households, who paid 172 dues, and was served by the churches of Morī Dodō and Morī Gewargīs and three priests. The Church of Morī Dodō purported to possess relics of the saint.

In 1915, there were 30 Syriac families. (Note: According to Gaunt, there were 300 Syriac families.) It had five priests. Amidst the Sayfo, on 6 June 1915, the village withstood an attack by the Kurdish Ömerkan, ‘Alikan, and Dörekan tribes and the villagers were fired upon by an Al-Khamsin militia detachment that had arrived and promised to protect them. The village's notables were killed. After three days of fighting, the villagers were able to flee to Azakh after the priest ‘Abdallahad Jebbo managed to bribe the detachment commander Ilyas Chelebi and Isfes was subsequently looted and burned as they fled. Anthimus of Isfes, metropolitan of the Monastery of the Cross, was killed at Karburan.

In 1926, the village was disarmed under pressure from the Turkish government and then plundered whilst the men were killed in forced deportations to Diyarbakır and Cizre and the women and children were left at the mercy of the Turkish soldiers. The Syriac population of Isfes began to emigrate to Al-Malikiyah in Syria from 1960 onwards. There were 3 Syriac families at the village in 1978. By 1979, there were no remaining Syriacs. (Note: According to Sinclair, the last Christian family left in c. 1977, whereas Courtois states that the last Syriac family left Isfes in 1980.) The Church of Mor Dodo was subsequently converted into a house and a barn.

== Bibliography ==
- Barsoum, Aphrem (2003). The Scattered Pearls: A History of Syriac Literature and Sciences. Translated by Matti Moosa (2nd ed.). Gorgias Press.
- Barsoum, Aphrem (2008). The History of Tur Abdin. Translated by Matti Moosa. Gorgias Press.
- Barsoum, Aphrem (2009). The Collected Historical Essays of Aphram I Barsoum. Vol. 1. Translated by Matti Moosa. Gorgias Press.
- Baz, Ibrahim (2016). Şırnak aşiretleri ve kültürü (in Turkish). p. 133. ISBN 9786058849631.
- Bcheiry, Iskandar (2009). The Syriac Orthodox Patriarchal Register of Dues of 1870: An Unpublished Historical Document from the Late Ottoman Period. Gorgias Press.
- Brock, Sebastian (2021). "The Syrian Orthodox Church in the twentieth century". Eastern Christianity, Theological Reflection on Religion, Culture, and Politics in the Holy Land and Christian Encounter with Islam and the Muslim World (PDF). Living Stones of the Holy Land Trust. pp. 155–181.
- Courtois, Sébastien de (2004). The Forgotten Genocide: Eastern Christians, The Last Arameans. Translated by Vincent Aurora. Gorgias Press.
- Courtois, Sébastien de (2013). "Tur Abdin : Réflexions sur l'état présent descommunautés syriaques du Sud-Est de la Turquie, mémoire, exils, retours". Cahier du Gremmamo (in French). 21: 113–150.
- Dignas, Beate; Winter, Engelbert (2007). Rome and Persia in Late Antiquity: Neighbours and Rivals. Cambridge University Press.
- Dinno, Khalid S. (2017). The Syrian Orthodox Christians in the Late Ottoman Period and Beyond: Crisis then Revival. Gorgias Press.
- Gaunt, David (2006). Massacres, Resistance, Protectors: Muslim-Christian Relations in Eastern Anatolia during World War I. Gorgias Press.
- Palmer, Andrew (1990). Monk and Mason on the Tigris Frontier: The Early History of Tur Abdin. Cambridge University Press.
- Sato, Noriko (2001). Memory and Social Identity among Syrian Orthodox Christians (PDF).
- Sinclair, T. A. (1989). Eastern Turkey: An Architectural and Archaeological Survey. Vol. III. London: The Pindar Press.
- Yacoub, Joseph (2016). Year of the Sword: The Assyrian Christian Genocide, A History. Translated by James Ferguson. Oxford University Press.
