= Pınarbaşı, İdil =

Village in Şırnak Province, Turkey

Pınarbaşı
- Village
- Location within Turkey
- Coordinates: 37.215°N 41.888°E
- Country: Turkey
- Province: Şırnak
- District: İdil
- Population (2021): 2,916
- Time zone: UTC+3 (TRT)

Pınarbaşı (Kurdish: Aynserê; Syriac: ʿAyn-Sare) (Note: Alternatively transliterated as ‘Ayn Sarī, Ayınser, or Aïsaré.) is a village in the İdil District of Şırnak Province in Turkey. The village is populated by Kurds of the Hesinan tribe and had a population of 2,916 in 2021. It is the largest village in the district.

== History ==
ʿAyn-Sare (today called Pınarbaşı) was historically inhabited by Syriac Orthodox Christians. In the Syriac Orthodox patriarchal register of dues of 1870, it was recorded that the village had eight households, who paid twenty-six dues, and did not have a church or a priest. In 1914, the village was inhabited by 150 Syriacs, according to the Assyro-Chaldean delegation to the Paris Peace Conference. There was fifteen Syriac families and a significant Kurdish population. Amidst the Sayfo, a number of Syriacs fled to Azakh after having been warned by a Kurdish woman that their Kurdish neighbours were conspiring to massacre them, whilst those who did not believe her and remained at ʿAyn-Sare were killed.

== Bibliography ==
- Baz, Ibrahim (2016). Şırnak aşiretleri ve kültürü (in Turkish). p. 137. ISBN 9786058849631.
- Bcheiry, Iskandar (2009). The Syriac Orthodox Patriarchal Register of Dues of 1870: An Unpublished Historical Document from the Late Ottoman Period. Gorgias Press.
- Bcheiry, Iskandar (2019). "Digitizing and Schematizing the Archival Material from the Late Ottoman Period Found in the Monastery of al-Zaʿfarān in Southeast Turkey". Atla Summary of Proceedings. 72 (January): 50–61. doi:10.31046/proceedings.2018.113.
- Gaunt, David (2006). Massacres, Resistance, Protectors: Muslim-Christian Relations in Eastern Anatolia during World War I. Gorgias Press.
- Jongerden, Joost; Verheij, Jelle, eds. (2012). Social Relations in Ottoman Diyarbekir, 1870-1915. Brill.
