= Mağaraköy, İdil =

Mağaraköy
- Village
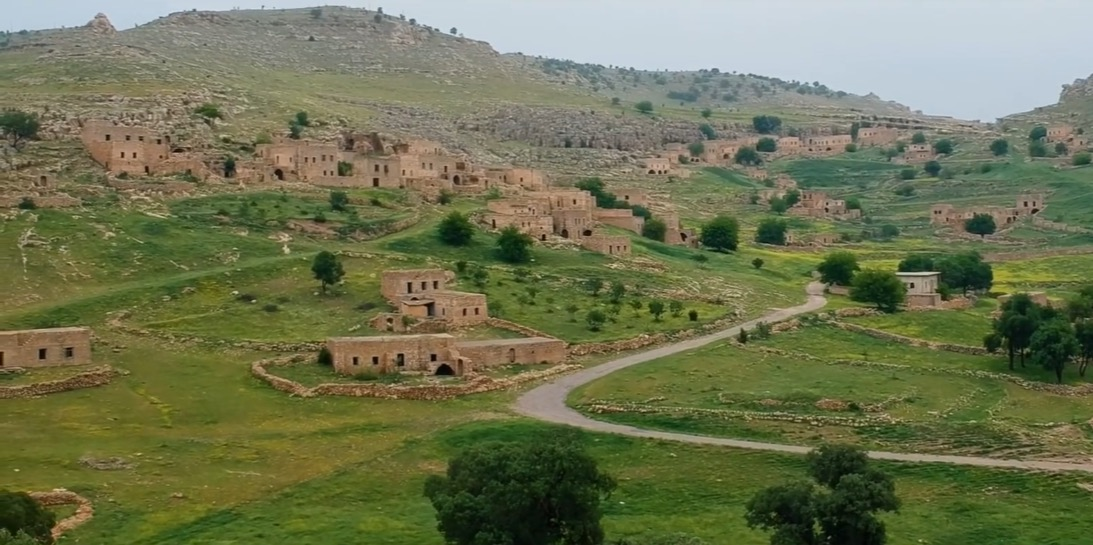
- Village

- Location within Turkey
- Coordinates: 37.285°N 41.571°E
- Country: Turkey
- Province: Şırnak
- District: İdil
- Population (2022): 15
- Time zone: UTC+3 (TRT)

Mağaraköy or Mağara (Kurdish: Kiwex; (Note: Also spelt as Kīwax.) Syriac: Kīvakh) (Note: Alternatively transliterated as Kivah, Kīvaḫ, Kivakh, Kiwah, Kiwakh, or Kowak.) is a village in the İdil District of the Şırnak Province in Turkey. The village is populated by Kurds of the Salihan tribe.

== History ==
Kīvakh (today called Mağaraköy) is identified with the town of Kibaki, which submitted to Ashurnasirpal II during his campaign against Nairi in 879 BC. Ashurnasirpal II spent one night encamped at Kibaki and received cattle, sheep, wine, and bronze cooking-pots in tribute. It was located in the Kašiēri mountains. The Eastern Roman Emperor Anastasius I Dicorus (r. 491–518) is said to have donated the village to the Mor Gabriel Monastery.

At the beginning of the 20th century, it was a large village and was home to the Yazidi Çelkî tribe. When the Ottomans called upon them to join the army in 1910s, they refused. No school existed in the village. Yazidi Kurds from the village are said to have helped the Christians of Azekh amidst the Sayfo to fight Turkish Kurds. They also provided information, weapons, and transport to the Syriacs at ‘Ayn-Wardo. The village was disarmed by the Turkish state in 1926 in the aftermath of the Sheikh Said rebellion.

A ruined church was extant at the village in 1978. In the 1980s, the village was reported to be populated by the Hevirkan tribe, a tribe of Yazidi belief. In 2018, the village was reported to be populated by the Salihan tribe. The Salihan tribe has both Muslim and Yazidi members, but the ones in Mağara are Yazidi. In 2022, the village had a population of 15, increased from 6 in 2012.

== Bibliography ==
- Bilge, Yakup (2012). "The Saint Gabriel Monastery Trust". In Pieter Omtzigt; Markus K. Tozman; Andrea Tyndall (eds.). The Slow Disappearance of the Syriacs from Turkey and of the Grounds of the Mor Gabriel Monastery (PDF). LIT Verlag Münster. pp. 209–218.
- Courtois, Sébastien de (2004). The Forgotten Genocide: Eastern Christians, The Last Arameans. Translated by Vincent Aurora. Gorgias Press.
- Gaunt, David (2006). Massacres, Resistance, Protectors: Muslim-Christian Relations in Eastern Anatolia during World War I. Gorgias Press.
- Jongerden, Joost; Verheij, Jelle, eds. (2012). Social Relations in Ottoman Diyarbekir, 1870-1915. Brill.
- Kreyenbroek, Philip G. (2009). Yezidism in Europe: Different Generations Speak about Their Religion. Otto Harrassowitz Verlag. ISBN 9783447060608.
- Palmer, Andrew (1990). Monk and Mason on the Tigris Frontier: The Early History of Tur Abdin. Cambridge University Press.
- Radner, Karen (2006). "How to reach the Upper Tigris: The route through the Tur Abdin" (PDF). State Archives of Assyria Bulletin. 15: 273–305.
- Ritter, Hellmut (1967). Turoyo: Die Volkssprache der Syrischen Christen des Tur 'Abdin (in German). Vol. 1. Franz Steiner Verlag.
- Sinclair, T. A (1989). Eastern Turkey: An Architectural & Archaeological Survey. Vol. III.
- Tachjian, Vahé (2004). La France en Cilicie et en Haute-Mésopotamie - aux confins de la Turquie, de la Syrie et de l'Irak, 1919-1933 (in French). Karthala.
- Tan, Altan (2018). Turabidin'den Berriye'ye. Aşiretler - Dinler - Diller - Kültürler (in Turkish). ISBN 9789944360944.
- Wießner, Gernot (1983). Christliche Kultbauten im Ṭūr ʻAbdīn (in German). Vol. II. Harrassowitz Verlag.
