= Basil Solomon =

Leader of the Syriac Orthodox Church

- Syriac Orthodox Maphrian of the East
- Church: Syriac Orthodox Church
- Installed: 1509
- Term ended: 1518
- Predecessor: Basil Abraham III
- Successor: Basil Athanasius Habib

Personal details
- Born: Mardin
- Died: 1518

Basil Solomon was the Maphrian of the East and head of the Syriac Orthodox Church of the East from 1509 until his death in 1518.

== Biography ==
Solomon was born in the late 15th century at Mardin, and was the son of Joseph, son of Elianus. He became a monk at the Monastery of Saint Ananias before 1495. Solomon was noted for his proficiency in the Syriac language, and he transcribed the dictionary of Bar Ali for Dionysius, archbishop of Ma’dan, in 1499. He succeeded Basil Abraham III as Maphrian of the East after a two-year vacancy and was ordained by Ignatius Yeshu I in late 1509, upon which he assumed the name Basil.

In 1514, Solomon was forced to flee from Mosul due to accusations against him, and he took refuge at the village of Esfes near Gazarta, where he resided for the remainder of his reign. Despite this, he continued to ordain deacons and priests for churches in Mosul, Gazarta, and Azakh. Solomon served as Maphrian of the East until his death in 1518, and he was likely buried at the church of Saint David.

== Bibliography ==
- Barsoum, Aphrem (2008). History of the Za'faran Monastery. Translated by Matti Moosa. Gorgias Press.
- Barsoum, Aphrem (2009). The Collected Historical Essays of Aphram I Barsoum. Vol. 1. Translated by Matti Moosa. Gorgias Press.

Preceded by Basil Abraham III	Syriac Orthodox Maphrian of the East; 1509–1518	Succeeded by Basil Athanasius Habib
