= Marjab =

Marjab is the name of several people. These include:

- a Christian priest martyred with Desan and several others in 355
- a Christian deacon martyred with Abda and Abdjesus in 366
