= Alakamış, İdil =

Village in Şırnak Province, Turkey

Alakamış
- Village
- Location within Turkey
- Coordinates: 37.159°N 41.789°E
- Country: Turkey
- Province: Şırnak
- District: İdil
- Population (2021): 693
- Time zone: UTC+3 (TRT)

Alakamış (Kurdish: Eleqamiş) is a village in the İdil District of Şırnak Province in Turkey. The village is populated by Kurds of the Hemikan tribe and had a population of 693 in 2021.
