= Aksoy, İdil =

Village in Şırnak Province, Turkey

Aksoy
- Village
- Location within Turkey
- Coordinates: 37.221°N 41.677°E
- Country: Turkey
- Province: Şırnak
- District: İdil
- Population (2021): 1,042
- Time zone: UTC+3 (TRT)

Aksoy (Kurdish: Mamulan) is a village in the İdil District of Şırnak Province in Turkey. The village is populated by Kurds of the Botikan tribe and had a population of 1,042 in 2021.
