= Çınarlı, İdil =

Village in Şırnak Province, Turkey

Çınarlı
- Village
- Location within Turkey
- Coordinates: 37.368°N 41.597°E
- Country: Turkey
- Province: Şırnak
- District: İdil
- Population (2021): 139
- Time zone: UTC+3 (TRT)

Çınarlı (Kurdish: Bakwan) is a village in the İdil District of Şırnak Province in Turkey. The village is populated by Kurds of the Salihan tribe and had a population of 139 in 2021.
