= Desan (bishop) =

Bishop of the Christian Church (died 355)

Desan (died 355 AD) was a bishop of the Christian Church.

He was a resident of Bizabda (near present-day Hendekköy, İdil) in Mesopotamia during the reign of Shapur II. He refused to turn away from the Christian faith and was on that basis transported to Persia where he was killed in 355. He was accompanied in martyrdom by a number of others, including: Heliodorus, another Christian bishop; Marjab, a Christian priest; Abdjesus, and 270 others.

They are all collectively commemorated with a feast day on April 9.

== Sources ==
- Holweck, F. G. A Biographical Dictionary of the Saints. St. Louis, MO: B. Herder Book Co., 1924.
