= Okçu, İdil =

Village in Şırnak Province, Turkey

Okçu
- Village
- Location within Turkey
- Coordinates: 37.224°N 42.016°E
- Country: Turkey
- Province: Şırnak
- District: İdil
- Population (2021): 853
- Time zone: UTC+3 (TRT)

Okçu (Kurdish: Sivik) is a village in the İdil District of Şırnak Province in Turkey. The village is populated by Kurds of the Elîkan tribe and had a population of 853 in 2021.
