= Peçenek, İdil =

Village in Şırnak Province, Turkey

Peçenek
- Village
- Location within Turkey
- Coordinates: 37.366°N 41.798°E
- Country: Turkey
- Province: Şırnak
- District: İdil
- Population (2021): 61
- Time zone: UTC+3 (TRT)

Peçenek (Kurdish: Mirik) is a village in the İdil District of Şırnak Province in Turkey. The village is populated by Kurds of the Omerkan tribe and had a population of 61 in 2021.
