= Ocaklı, İdil =

Village in Şırnak Province, Turkey

Ocaklı
- Village
- Location within Turkey
- Coordinates: 37.164°N 41.824°E
- Country: Turkey
- Province: Şırnak
- District: İdil
- Population (2021): 359
- Time zone: UTC+3 (TRT)

Ocaklı (Kurdish: Banih) is a village in the İdil District of Şırnak Province in Turkey. The village is populated by Kurds of the Hesinan tribe and had a population of 359 in 2021.
