= Kentli, İdil =

Village in Şırnak Province, Turkey

Kentli
- Village
- Location within Turkey
- Coordinates: 37.393°N 41.640°E
- Country: Turkey
- Province: Şırnak
- District: İdil
- Population (2021): 195
- Time zone: UTC+3 (TRT)

Kentli (Kurdish: Bazgûr) is a village in the İdil District of Şırnak Province in Turkey. The village is populated by Kurds of the Dorikan tribe and had a population of 195 in 2021.

The hamlet of Yokuş is attached to Kentli.
