= Sulak, İdil =

Village in Şırnak Province, Turkey

Sulak
- Village
- Location within Turkey
- Coordinates: 37.415°N 41.961°E
- Country: Turkey
- Province: Şırnak
- District: İdil
- Population (2021): 1,334
- Time zone: UTC+3 (TRT)

Sulak (Kurdish: Bafê) is a village in the İdil District of Şırnak Province in Turkey. The village is populated by Kurds of the Harunan tribe and had a population of 1,334 in 2021.

The hamlet of Bahçe is attached to Sulak.
