= Yuvalı, İdil =

Village in Şırnak Province, Turkey

Yuvalı
- Village
- Location within Turkey
- Coordinates: 37.387°N 42.073°E
- Country: Turkey
- Province: Şırnak
- District: İdil
- Population (2021): 291
- Time zone: UTC+3 (TRT)

Yuvalı (Kurdish: Cerahî; Syriac: Ğrāḥiyyah) (Note: Alternatively transliterated as Cerrahi, Cerrahı, Chariha, Djerahi, Djerahie, Djerahié, or Jarahia.) is a village in the İdil District of Şırnak Province in Turkey. The village is populated by Kurds of the Harunan tribe and had a population of 291 in 2021.

The hamlets of Camili and Yamaç are attached to the village.

== History ==
Ğrāḥiyyah (today called Yuvalı) was historically inhabited by Syriac Orthodox Christians, Chaldean Catholics, and Armenians. In the Syriac Orthodox patriarchal register of dues of 1870, it was recorded that the village had 6 households, who paid 25 dues, and it did not have a church or a priest. In 1914, there were 100 Syriacs, according to the list presented to the Paris Peace Conference by the Assyro-Chaldean delegation. It was located in the kaza of Jazirat Ibn ʿUmar. Amidst the Sayfo, the village was attacked and the Christians were killed by Kurds of the Mamman tribe on 18 June 1915.

== Bibliography ==
- Bcheiry, Iskandar (2009). The Syriac Orthodox Patriarchal Register of Dues of 1870: An Unpublished Historical Document from the Late Ottoman Period. Gorgias Press.
- Courtois, Sébastien de (2004). The Forgotten Genocide: Eastern Christians, The Last Arameans. Translated by Vincent Aurora. Gorgias Press.
- Gaunt, David (2006). Massacres, Resistance, Protectors: Muslim-Christian Relations in Eastern Anatolia during World War I. Gorgias Press.
- Jongerden, Joost; Verheij, Jelle, eds. (2012). Social Relations in Ottoman Diyarbekir, 1870-1915. Brill.
- Tan, Altan (2018). Turabidin'den Berriye'ye. Aşiretler - Dinler - Diller - Kültürler (in Turkish). Pak Ajans Yayincilik Turizm Ve Diş Ticaret Limited şirketi. ISBN 9789944360944.
