= Tekeköy, İdil =

Village in Şırnak Province, Turkey

Tekeköy
- Village
- Location within Turkey
- Coordinates: 37.263°N 41.961°E
- Country: Turkey
- Province: Şırnak
- District: İdil
- Population (2021): 2,219
- Time zone: UTC+3 (TRT)

Tekeköy (Kurdish: Xirabê Nêriyan) is a village in the İdil District of Şırnak Province in Turkey. The village is populated by Kurds of the Omerkan tribe and had a population of 2,291 in 2021.
