= Kaşıkçı, İdil =

Village in Şırnak Province, Turkey

Kaşıkçı
- Village
- Location within Turkey
- Coordinates: 37.431°N 41.612°E
- Country: Turkey
- Province: Şırnak
- District: İdil
- Population (2021): 204
- Time zone: UTC+3 (TRT)

Kaşıkçı (Kurdish: Heskan) is a village in the İdil District of Şırnak Province in Turkey. The village is populated by Kurds of the Dermemikan tribe and had a population of 204 in 2021.

The hamlet of Sivrice is attached to Kaşıkçı.
