= Çığır, İdil =

Village in Şırnak Province, Turkey

Çığır
- Village
- Location within Turkey
- Coordinates: 37.161°N 41.740°E
- Country: Turkey
- Province: Şırnak
- District: İdil
- Population (2021): 1,878
- Time zone: UTC+3 (TRT)

Çığır (Kurdish: Serkanî; Syriac: Serkani) (Note: Alternatively transliterated as Serkan or Srganée.) is a village in the İdil District of Şırnak Province in Turkey. The village is populated by Kurds of the Botikan tribe and had a population of 1,878 in 2021.

The hamlet of Gültepe is attached to Çığır.

== History ==
Serkani (today called Çığır) was historically inhabited by Syriac Orthodox Christians. It was populated by 200 Syriacs in 1914, according to according to the list presented to the Paris Peace Conference by the Assyro-Chaldean delegation.

== Bibliography ==
- Gaunt, David (2006). Massacres, Resistance, Protectors: Muslim-Christian Relations in Eastern Anatolia during World War I. Gorgias Press.
- Jongerden, Joost; Verheij, Jelle, eds. (2012). Social Relations in Ottoman Diyarbekir, 1870-1915. Brill.
- Tan, Altan (2018). Turabidin'den Berriye'ye. Aşiretler - Dinler - Diller - Kültürler (in Turkish). Pak Ajans Yayincilik Turizm Ve Diş Ticaret Limited şirketi. p. 165. ISBN 9789944360944.
