= Kurtuluş, İdil =

Village in Şırnak Province, Turkey

Kurtuluş
- Village
- Location within Turkey
- Coordinates: 37.200°N 41.701°E
- Country: Turkey
- Province: Şırnak
- District: İdil
- Population (2021): 291
- Time zone: UTC+3 (TRT)

Kurtuluş (Kurdish: Batil) is a village in the İdil District of Şırnak Province in Turkey. The village is populated by Kurds of the Botikan tribe and had a population of 291 in 2021.

The hamlet of Bozatlı is attached to Kurtuluş.
