= Varımlı, İdil =

Village in Şırnak Province, Turkey

Varımlı
- Village
- Location within Turkey
- Coordinates: 37.190°N 41.833°E
- Country: Turkey
- Province: Şırnak
- District: İdil
- Population (2021): 680
- Time zone: UTC+3 (TRT)

Varımlı (Kurdish: Qere Xirab) is a village in the İdil District of Şırnak Province in Turkey. The village is populated by Kurds of the Hemikan tribe and had a population of 680 in 2021.
