= Bereketli, İdil =

Village in Şırnak Province, Turkey

Bereketli
- Village
- Location within Turkey
- Coordinates: 37.383°N 41.819°E
- Country: Turkey
- Province: Şırnak
- District: İdil
- Population (2021): 161
- Time zone: UTC+3 (TRT)

Bereketli (Kurdish: Fîl; Syriac: Fīl) (Note: Formerly known as Fīr or Fir.) is a village in the İdil District of Şırnak Province in Turkey. The village is populated by Kurds of the Omerkan tribe and had a population of 161 in 2021.

== History ==
Fīl (today called Bereketli) was historically inhabited by adherents of the Church of the East. The Church of St. Sava-Pirgushnasp at Fīl, which had previously belonged to the Church of the East, came under the control of the Syriac Orthodox Church prior to the 18th century following the conversion of some of the villagers. By 1978, there were ruins of a large Christian settlement, including a graveyard and part of a church apse.

== Bibliography ==
- Al-Jeloo, Nicholas (2015). "Transferrable Religious Heritage: Church Buildings in Northern Mesopotamia". Le patrimoine architectural de l'Église orthodoxe d'Antioche: Perspectives comparatives avec les autres groupes religieux du Moyen-Orient et des régions limitrophes. Publications of the University of Balamand. pp. 111–127.
- Baz, Ibrahim (2016). Şırnak aşiretleri ve kültürü (in Turkish). ISBN 9786058849631.
- Palmer, Andrew (1990). Monk and Mason on the Tigris Frontier: The Early History of Tur Abdin. Cambridge University Press.
- Sinclair, T. A (1989). Eastern Turkey: An Architectural & Archaeological Survey. Vol. III.
