= Ulak, İdil =

Village in Şırnak Province, Turkey

Ulak
- Village
- Location within Turkey
- Coordinates: 37.273°N 41.800°E
- Country: Turkey
- Province: Şırnak
- District: İdil
- Population (2021): 895
- Time zone: UTC+3 (TRT)

Ulak (Kurdish: Filfêl) is a village in the İdil District of Şırnak Province in Turkey. The village is populated by Kurds of the Salihan tribe and had a population of 895 in 2021.
