= Tepecik, İdil =

Village in Şırnak Province, Turkey

Tepecik
- Village
- Location within Turkey
- Coordinates: 37.147°N 41.755°E
- Country: Turkey
- Province: Şırnak
- District: İdil
- Population (2021): 877
- Time zone: UTC+3 (TRT)

Tepecik (Kurdish: Zêwik) is a village in the İdil District of Şırnak Province in Turkey. The village is populated by Kurds of the Hesinan tribe and had a population of 877 in 2021.
