= Yavşan, İdil =

Village in Şırnak Province, Turkey

Yavşan
- Village
- Location within Turkey
- Coordinates: 37.201°N 41.984°E
- Country: Turkey
- Province: Şırnak
- District: İdil
- Population (2021): 1,060
- Time zone: UTC+3 (TRT)

Yavşan (Kurdish: Zergûz) is a village in the İdil District of Şırnak Province in Turkey. The village is populated by Kurds of the Elîkan tribe and had a population of 1,060 in 2021.

The two hamlets of Doğanlar and Yukarıyavşan (Zergûza Banî) are attached to the village.
