= Duruköy, İdil =

Village in Şırnak Province, Turkey

Duruköy
- Village
- Location within Turkey
- Coordinates: 37.223°N 41.916°E
- Country: Turkey
- Province: Şırnak
- District: İdil
- Population (2021): 1,001
- Time zone: UTC+3 (TRT)

Duruköy (Kurdish: Danêr; Syriac: Dānīr) is a village in the İdil District of Şırnak Province in Turkey. The village is populated by Kurds of the Hesinan tribe and had a population of 1,001 in 2021.

The hamlet of Çayırlı is attached to Duruköy.

== History ==
Dānīr (today called Duruköy) was historically inhabited by Syriac Orthodox Christians. In the Syriac Orthodox patriarchal register of dues of 1870, it was recorded that the village had one household, who paid five dues, and it did not have a church or a priest.

== Bibliography ==
- Baz, Ibrahim (2016). Şırnak aşiretleri ve kültürü (in Turkish). ISBN 9786058849631.
- Bcheiry, Iskandar (2009). The Syriac Orthodox Patriarchal Register of Dues of 1870: An Unpublished Historical Document from the Late Ottoman Period. Gorgias Press.
