= Yolaçan, İdil =

Village in Şırnak Province, Turkey

Yolaçan
- Village
- Location within Turkey
- Coordinates: 37.166°N 41.847°E
- Country: Turkey
- Province: Şırnak
- District: İdil
- Population (2021): 350
- Time zone: UTC+3 (TRT)

Yolaçan (Kurdish: Narîncî) is a village in the İdil District of Şırnak Province in Turkey. The village is populated by Kurds of the Hesinan tribe and had a population of 350 in 2021.
