= Yüksekköy, İdil =

Village in Şırnak Province, Turkey

Yüksekköy
- Village
- Location within Turkey
- Coordinates: 37.276°N 41.937°E
- Country: Turkey
- Province: Şırnak
- District: İdil
- Population (2021): 918
- Time zone: UTC+3 (TRT)

Yüksekköy (Kurdish: Barim) is a village in the İdil District of Şırnak Province in Turkey. The village is populated by Kurds of the Aluwa tribe and had a population of 918 in 2021.
