= Çukurlu, İdil =

Village in Şırnak Province, Turkey

Çukurlu
- Village
- Location within Turkey
- Coordinates: 37.410°N 41.741°E
- Country: Turkey
- Province: Şırnak
- District: İdil
- Population (2021): 143
- Time zone: UTC+3 (TRT)

Çukurlu (Kurdish: Xendûk) is a village in the İdil District of Şırnak Province in Turkey. The village is populated by Kurds of the Omerkan tribe and had a population of 143 in 2021.

The hamlet of Ağaçlı is attached to Çukurlu.
