= Işık, İdil =

Village in Şırnak Province, Turkey

Işık
- Village
- Location within Turkey
- Coordinates: 37.394°N 41.687°E
- Country: Turkey
- Province: Şırnak
- District: İdil
- Population (2021): 64
- Time zone: UTC+3 (TRT)

Işık (Kurdish: Xaltan) is a village in the İdil District of Şırnak Province in Turkey. The village is populated by Kurds of the Dorikan tribe and had a population of 64 in 2021.
