= Özen, İdil =

Village in Şırnak Province, Turkey

Özen
- Village
- Location within Turkey
- Coordinates: 37.266°N 41.976°E
- Country: Turkey
- Province: Şırnak
- District: İdil
- Population (2021): 2,036
- Time zone: UTC+3 (TRT)

Özen (Kurdish: Xiraba Tûya) is a village in the İdil District of Şırnak Province in Turkey. The village is populated by Kurds of the Elîkan and Meman tribes and had a population of 2,036 in 2021.
