= Oyalı, İdil =

Village in Şırnak Province, Turkey

Oyalı
- Village
- Location within Turkey
- Coordinates: 37.228°N 41.742°E
- Country: Turkey
- Province: Şırnak
- District: İdil
- Population (2021): 2,319
- Time zone: UTC+3 (TRT)

Oyalı (Kurdish: Delavê Qesrê) (Note: Also known as Alian, Alyan Delavikasır, Dalavakasır, or Dellanükasır.) is a village in the İdil District of Şırnak Province in Turkey. The village is populated by Kurds of the Hemikan tribe and had a population of 2,319 in 2021.

== History ==
Delavê Qesrê (today called Oyalı) was historically inhabited by Syriac Orthodox Christians. In 1914, it was populated by 100 Syriacs, as per the list presented to the Paris Peace Conference by the Assyro-Chaldean delegation. It was located in the kaza of Nusaybin.

== Bibliography ==
- Baz, Ibrahim (2016). Şırnak aşiretleri ve kültürü (in Turkish). ISBN 9786058849631.
- Gaunt, David (2006). Massacres, Resistance, Protectors: Muslim-Christian Relations in Eastern Anatolia during World War I. Gorgias Press.
- Jongerden, Joost; Verheij, Jelle, eds. (2012). Social Relations in Ottoman Diyarbekir, 1870-1915. Brill.
- Tan, Altan (2018). Turabidin'den Berriye'ye. Aşiretler - Dinler - Diller - Kültürler (in Turkish). ISBN 9789944360944.
