= Mor Dodo =

Syriac Orthodox Saint

Saint Dodo

Bishop
- Born: David; 530; Sidos, Sasanian Empire
- Died: 20 May 609; Tagrit, Sasanian Empire
- Venerated in: Oriental Orthodoxy
- Major shrine: Church of Mor Dodo, Beth Sbirino, Turkey
- Feast: 20 May

Mor Gregorios Dodo was the Syriac Orthodox Bishop of Tagrit from 589 until his death in 609.

== Biography ==
David was born in the Syriac village of Sidos, in the region of Orumi, into a wealthy Christian family who raised him in a Christian upbringing. His parents were called Shem’un and Helene (Simon and Helen). They nicknamed him "Dodo", which means "beloved" in Syriac Aramaic. When he reached adolescence, his parents told him about marriage because that was the custom in those days. He refused to marry because he wanted to devote his heart to Christ.

After his parents died, David distributed their possessions to the poor and became a monk at the monastery of Mor Daweed (David) in the Eynali mountains. After two years in the monastery the abbot Mor Daweed died and hereafter David secretly left and isolated himself on the highest mountain for 12 years.

One night the new abbot had a vision of David's poor condition and in the following morning, he and other monks found him and brought him back to the monastery. After he had stayed a week he became healthy and left to visit the Holy Land. He visited the monasteries in Egypt where he received the blessing of the hermits there. On his way back to the monastery he visited the towns of Azekh and Esfes where he found a narrow crevice in an area known as the "Valley of Hell", which he lived in for two years.

Here he performed miracles and was later joined by his cousin Mor Isaac and forty monks. The villagers of Esfes wanted to build him a monastery so he would not have to live in the crevice. Whilst digging, a poisonous snake killed two men and when David heard of this he did not want to be called David anymore as he said he was not worthy of the same name of King David. Henceforth David was known as Dodo.

After seven months of construction the monastery was finished and named after him. Mor Dodo became abbot of the monastery and the forty monks and over time the valley became a spiritual shelter and oasis.

In 589 the bishop of Tagrit died and Mor Dodo was chosen by the Patriarch Peter III of Raqqa to succeed him which he refused but later accepted and was ordained with the name Mor Gregorios. Before leaving Mor Dodo left his cousin Mor Isaac as abbot of the forty monks.

On the day of his entrance into the city he healed sick people, cleansed lepers, and gave sight to the blind. Also during his twenty years as bishop, Mor Dodo consecrated 1300 Priests and 1700 deacons before dying from illness on May 20 609. Mor Dodo was buried in Tagrit Cathedral and his funeral was attended by 1800 priests.

Twenty years later, Mor Isaac moved Mor Dodo's remains from Tagrit to Beth Sbirino where a church was built to house his relics, however, a dispute arose between the peoples of Beth Sbirino and Esfes over who could house the relics. This was resolved by leaving Mor Dodo's body at Beth Sbirino whilst his right hand and skull were housed in Esfes.
