= Yayalar, İdil =

Village in Şırnak Province, Turkey

Yayalar
- Village
- Location within Turkey
- Coordinates: 37.354°N 41.592°E
- Country: Turkey
- Province: Şırnak
- District: İdil
- Population (2021): 208
- Time zone: UTC+3 (TRT)

Yayalar (Kurdish: Soran) is a village in the İdil District of Şırnak Province in Turkey. The village is populated by Kurds of the Salihan tribe and had a population of 208 in 2021.
