= Yalaz, İdil =

Village in Şırnak Province, Turkey

Yalaz
- Village
- Location within Turkey
- Coordinates: 37.413°N 42.008°E
- Country: Turkey
- Province: Şırnak
- District: İdil
- Population (2021): 44
- Time zone: UTC+3 (TRT)

Yalaz (Kurdish: Arzanex) is a village in the İdil District of Şırnak Province in Turkey. The village is populated by Kurds of the Harunan tribe and had a population of 44 in 2021.
