= Üçok, İdil =

Village in Şırnak Province, Turkey

Üçok
- Village
- Location within Turkey
- Coordinates: 37.291°N 41.911°E
- Country: Turkey
- Province: Şırnak
- District: İdil
- Population (2021): 519
- Time zone: UTC+3 (TRT)

Üçok (Kurdish: Babek; Syriac: Bābeq) (Note: Also known as Babeqqa, Bābeqah, Bābqqa, Babekka, Babika, Babiqqa, Babokat, or Bebek.) is a village in the İdil District of Şırnak Province in Turkey. The village is populated by Kurds of the Hesinan tribe and had a population of 519 in 2021.

== History ==
Bābeq (today called Üçok) was historically inhabited by Syriac Orthodox Christians. In the Syriac Orthodox patriarchal register of dues of 1870, it was recorded that the village had 13 households, who paid 24 dues, and it did not have a church or a priest. Bābeq was attacked by Hamidiye horsemen led by Mustapha Pasha on 20 December 1901 and 5 men from the village were killed, 7 were wounded, and all of their flocks were stolen. Some people from Azakh who decided to help the people of Bābeq were consequently ambushed by the Hamidiye en route to the village and a skirmish resulted in the death of 11 men from Azakh and seven injured whilst 2 Kurds were killed and 2 were wounded.

2 deacons were ordained for the Church of Mār Bihnām at Bābeq by Metropolitan Yuliyus Bihnām of Jazireh in 1328 AH (1910 AD). Amidst the Sayfo, the village was besieged by the Ömerkan, ‘Alikan, and ‘Aliyan tribes on 30 May 1915, but the siege was lifted after they were paid off by the nearby village of Azakh. After a short battle on 20 June 1915, the village's population of 60 Syriac families fled to Azakh. Bābeq was subsequently seized by the Kurds.

== Bibliography ==
- Baz, Ibrahim (2016). Şırnak aşiretleri ve kültürü (in Turkish). ISBN 9786058849631.
- Bcheiry, Iskandar (2009). The Syriac Orthodox Patriarchal Register of Dues of 1870: An Unpublished Historical Document from the Late Ottoman Period. Gorgias Press.
- Bcheiry, Iskandar (2023). "A Syriac Orthodox List of Diyāqūs (Servants of the Church) from the Late Ottoman Period" (PDF). The International Journal of Levant Studies. 5: 25–74.
- Courtois, Sébastien de (2004). The Forgotten Genocide: Eastern Christians, The Last Arameans. Translated by Vincent Aurora. Gorgias Press.
- Gaunt, David (2006). Massacres, Resistance, Protectors: Muslim-Christian Relations in Eastern Anatolia during World War I. Gorgias Press.
- Jongerden, Joost; Verheij, Jelle, eds. (2012). Social Relations in Ottoman Diyarbekir, 1870-1915. Brill.
- Sato, Noriko (2001). Memory and Social Identity among Syrian Orthodox Christians (PDF).
