= Tepeköy, İdil =

Village in Şırnak Province, Turkey

Tepeköy
- Village
- Location within Turkey
- Coordinates: 37.297°N 41.824°E
- Country: Turkey
- Province: Şırnak
- District: İdil
- Population (2021): 1,970
- Time zone: UTC+3 (TRT)

Tepeköy (Kurdish: Xerabê Ripin; Syriac: Ḫarābī Rabban) (Note: Alternatively transliterated as Kherabe-Rappen.) is a village in the İdil District of Şırnak Province in Turkey. The village is populated by Kurds of the Aluwa and Hesinan tribes and had a population of 1,970 in 2021.

== History ==
Ḫarābī Rabban (today called Tepeköy) was historically inhabited by Syriac Orthodox Christians. In the Syriac Orthodox patriarchal register of dues of 1870, it was recorded that it had three households, who paid twenty-five dues, and it did not have a priest. There was a church of Morī Barṣawmō. The village was seized by Kurds in the Sayfo.

== Bibliography ==
- Baz, Ibrahim (2016). Şırnak aşiretleri ve kültürü (in Turkish). ISBN 9786058849631.
- Bcheiry, Iskandar (2009). The Syriac Orthodox Patriarchal Register of Dues of 1870: An Unpublished Historical Document from the Late Ottoman Period. Gorgias Press.
- Gaunt, David (2006). Massacres, Resistance, Protectors: Muslim-Christian Relations in Eastern Anatolia during World War I. Gorgias Press.
- Tan, Altan (2018). Turabidin'den Berriye'ye. Aşiretler - Dinler - Diller - Kültürler (in Turkish). Pak Ajans Yayincilik Turizm Ve Diş Ticaret Limited şirketi. ISBN 9789944360944.
