= Kayalı, İdil =

Village in the Şırnak Province, Turkey

Kayallı
- Village
- Location within Turkey
- Coordinates: 37.355°N 41.793°E
- Country: Turkey
- Province: Şırnak
- District: İdil
- Population (2021): 433
- Time zone: UTC+3 (TRT)

Kayalı (Kurdish: Kefşîn; (Note: Also spelt as Kifshenne.) Syriac: Kefshenne) (Note: Alternatively transliterated as Cafchené, Kafašnī, Kafshinne, or Kfarshenne.) is a village in the İdil District of Şırnak Province in Turkey. The village is populated by Kurds of the Dorikan tribe and had a population of 433 in 2021.

== History ==
Kefshenne (today called Kayalı) was historically inhabited by Syriac Orthodox Christians. In the Syriac Orthodox patriarchal register of dues of 1870, it was recorded that the village had 37 households, who paid 236 dues, and it did not have a church or a priest. In 1914, the village was inhabited by 200 Syriacs, according to the list presented to the Paris Peace Conference by the Assyro-Chaldean delegation. There were 25–30 Syriac families in 1915. They had a Syriac landlord, Hano Basuski. It was located in the kaza of Jazirat Ibn ʿUmar. Amidst the Sayfo, the Syriacs fled with all their property to Azakh after having been warned by the Muslim villagers to flee for their own safety. They returned to Kefshenne after the war, but later emigrated to Mosul in Iraq. The village was subsequently seized by Kurds. By 1987, there were no remaining Syriacs.

== Bibliography ==
- Baz, Ibrahim (2016). Şırnak aşiretleri ve kültürü (in Turkish). ISBN 9786058849631.
- Bcheiry, Iskandar (2009). The Syriac Orthodox Patriarchal Register of Dues of 1870: An Unpublished Historical Document from the Late Ottoman Period. Gorgias Press.
- Biner, Zerrin Özlem (2020). States of Dispossession: Violence and Precarious Coexistence in Southeast Turkey. University of Pennsylvania Press.
- Courtois, Sébastien de (2004). The Forgotten Genocide: Eastern Christians, The Last Arameans. Translated by Vincent Aurora. Gorgias Press.
- Gaunt, David (2006). Massacres, Resistance, Protectors: Muslim-Christian Relations in Eastern Anatolia during World War I. Gorgias Press.
- Jongerden, Joost; Verheij, Jelle, eds. (2012). Social Relations in Ottoman Diyarbekir, 1870-1915. Brill.
- Yalçın, Idris (2015). "Geçmişten günümüze İdil'in siyasî, idarî, sosyo-ekonomik ve kültürel tarihî". Sosyal Bilimler Enstitüsü / Tarih Ana Bilim Dalı.
