= Dumanlı, İdil =

Village in Şırnak Province, Turkey

Dumanlı
- Village
- Location within Turkey
- Coordinates: 37.369°N 41.691°E
- Country: Turkey
- Province: Şırnak
- District: İdil
- Population (2021): 740
- Time zone: UTC+3 (TRT)

Dumanlı (Kurdish: Kefsûr) is a village in the İdil District of Şırnak Province in Turkey. The village is populated by Kurds of the Domanan tribe and had a population of 740 in 2021.
