= Uğrak, İdil =

Village in Şırnak Province, Turkey

Uğrak
- Village
- Location within Turkey
- Coordinates: 37.198°N 41.764°E
- Country: Turkey
- Province: Şırnak
- District: İdil
- Population (2021): 797
- Time zone: UTC+3 (TRT)

Uğrak (Kurdish: Xirabê Mişkê) is a village in the İdil District of Şırnak Province in Turkey. The village is populated by Kurds of the Hemikan tribe and had a population of 797 in 2021.

The hamlet of Başaklı is attached to Uğrak.
