= Topraklı, İdil =

Village in Şırnak Province, Turkey

Topraklı
- Village
- Location within Turkey
- Coordinates: 37.390°N 41.665°E
- Country: Turkey
- Province: Şırnak
- District: İdil
- Population (2021): 393
- Time zone: UTC+3 (TRT)

Topraklı (Kurdish: Xwarikê) is a village in the İdil District of Şırnak Province in Turkey. The village is populated by Kurds of the Dorikan tribe and had a population of 393 in 2021.

The hamlet of Böcekli is attached to Topraklı.
