= Kuyulu, İdil =

Village in Şırnak Province, Turkey

Kuyulu
- Village
- Location within Turkey
- Coordinates: 37.336°N 41.790°E
- Country: Turkey
- Province: Şırnak
- District: İdil
- Population (2021): 394
- Time zone: UTC+3 (TRT)

Kuyulu (Kurdish: Selekûn; Syriac: Šahirkā) (Note: Alternatively transliterated as Cherrigan, Serigir, Shahirkan, or Shehirkan.) is a village in the İdil District of Şırnak Province in Turkey. The village is populated by Kurds of the Hesinan tribe and had a population of 394 in 2021.

The hamlet of Tepeli is attached to Kuyulu.

== History ==
Šahirkā (today called Kuyulu) was historically inhabited by Syriac Orthodox Christians. In the Syriac Orthodox patriarchal register of dues of 1870, it was recorded that the village had 2 households, who paid 14 dues, and it did not have a church or a priest. In 1914, it was inhabited by 100 Syriacs, according to the list presented to the Paris Peace Conference by the Assyro-Chaldean delegation. There were 20 Syriac families in 1915. Amidst the Sayfo, half of the village was slaughtered whilst the survivors escaped to Hah. By 1987, there were no remaining Syriacs.

== Bibliography ==
- Bcheiry, Iskandar (2009). The Syriac Orthodox Patriarchal Register of Dues of 1870: An Unpublished Historical Document from the Late Ottoman Period. Gorgias Press.
- Courtois, Sébastien de (2004). The Forgotten Genocide: Eastern Christians, The Last Arameans. Translated by Vincent Aurora. Gorgias Press.
- Gaunt, David (2006). Massacres, Resistance, Protectors: Muslim-Christian Relations in Eastern Anatolia during World War I. Gorgias Press.
- Jongerden, Joost; Verheij, Jelle, eds. (2012). Social Relations in Ottoman Diyarbekir, 1870-1915. Brill.
- Tan, Altan (2018). Turabidin'den Berriye'ye. Aşiretler - Dinler - Diller - Kültürler (in Turkish). Pak Ajans Yayincilik Turizm Ve Diş Ticaret Limited şirketi. p. 270. ISBN 9789944360944.
