= Yağmurca, İdil =

Village in Şırnak Province, Turkey

Yağmurca
- Village
- Location within Turkey
- Coordinates: 37.198°N 42.005°E
- Country: Turkey
- Province: Şırnak
- District: İdil
- Population (2021): 145
- Time zone: UTC+3 (TRT)

Yağmurca (Kurdish: Xêlanî; Syriac: Kīllāniyyah) is a village in the İdil District of Şırnak Province in Turkey. The village is populated by Kurds of the Omerkan tribe and had a population of 145 in 2021.

== History ==
Kīllāniyyah (today called Yağmurca) was historically inhabited by Syriac Orthodox Christians. In the Syriac Orthodox patriarchal register of dues of 1870, it was recorded that the village had two households, who paid twenty-six dues, and it did not have a church or a priest.

== Bibliography ==
- Baz, Ibrahim (2016). Şırnak aşiretleri ve kültürü (in Turkish). ISBN 9786058849631.
- Bcheiry, Iskandar (2009). The Syriac Orthodox Patriarchal Register of Dues of 1870: An Unpublished Historical Document from the Late Ottoman Period. Gorgias Press.
