= Kırca, İdil =

Village in Şırnak Province, Turkey

Kırca
- Village
- Location within Turkey
- Coordinates: 37.216°N 41.729°E
- Country: Turkey
- Province: Şırnak
- District: İdil
- Population (2021): 358
- Time zone: UTC+3 (TRT)

Kırca (Kurdish: Abdika, Evdûka) is a village in the İdil District of Şırnak Province in Turkey. The village is populated by Kurds of the Botikan tribe and had a population of 358 in 2021.
