= Güzelova, İdil =

Village in Şırnak Province, Turkey

Güzelova
- Village
- Location within Turkey
- Coordinates: 37.378°N 41.622°E
- Country: Turkey
- Province: Şırnak
- District: İdil
- Population (2021): 325
- Time zone: UTC+3 (TRT)

Güzelova (Kurdish: Xana Hesso) is a village in the İdil District of Şırnak Province in Turkey. The village is populated by Kurds of the Dorikan tribe and had a population of 325 in 2021.

The hamlet of Alataş (Bosir) is attached to Güzelova.
