= Yazman, İdil =

Village in Şırnak Province, Turkey

Yazman
- Village
- Location within Turkey
- Coordinates: 37.249°N 41.763°E
- Country: Turkey
- Province: Şırnak
- District: İdil
- Population (2021): 813
- Time zone: UTC+3 (TRT)

Yazman (Kurdish: Hecîkesan) is a village in the İdil District of Şırnak Province in Turkey. The village is populated by Kurds of the Hemikan tribe and had a population of 813 in 2021.
