= Yörük, İdil =

Village in Şırnak Province, Turkey

Yörük
- Village
- Location within Turkey
- Coordinates: 37.281°N 42.023°E
- Country: Turkey
- Province: Şırnak
- District: İdil
- Population (2021): 202
- Time zone: UTC+3 (TRT)

Yörük (Kurdish: Dikê) is a village in the İdil District of Şırnak Province in Turkey. The village is populated by Kurds of the Elîkan tribe and had a population of 202 in 2021.
