= Oymak, İdil =

Village in Şırnak Province, Turkey

Oymak
- Village
- Location within Turkey
- Coordinates: 37.252°N 41.861°E
- Country: Turkey
- Province: Şırnak
- District: İdil
- Population (2021): 1,380
- Time zone: UTC+3 (TRT)

Oymak (Kurdish: Rêzok) (Note: Also known as Rizök, Rizok or Rjoké.) is a village in the İdil District of Şırnak Province in Turkey. The village is populated by Kurds of the Hesinan tribe and had a population of 1,380 in 2021.

The hamlet of Köşkönü is attached to the village.

== History ==
Rizök (today called Oymak) was historically inhabited by Syriac Orthodox Christians. It was located in the Midyat kaza in the Mardin sanjak in the Diyarbekir vilayet in c. 1900. In 1914, there were 100 Syriacs, as per the list presented to the Paris Peace Conference by the Assyro-Chaldean delegation.

== Bibliography ==
- Baz, Ibrahim (2016). Şırnak aşiretleri ve kültürü (in Turkish). ISBN 9786058849631.
- Gaunt, David (2006). Massacres, Resistance, Protectors: Muslim-Christian Relations in Eastern Anatolia during World War I. Gorgias Press.
- Jongerden, Joost; Verheij, Jelle, eds. (2012). Social Relations in Ottoman Diyarbekir, 1870-1915. Brill.
