= Akkoyunlu, İdil =

Village in Şırnak Province, Turkey

Akkoyunlu
- Village
- Location within Turkey
- Coordinates: 37.332°N 41.680°E
- Country: Turkey
- Province: Şırnak
- District: İdil
- Population (2021): 441
- Time zone: UTC+3 (TRT)

Akkoyunlu (Kurdish: Bêzikir) is a village in the İdil District of Şırnak Province in Turkey. The village is populated by Kurds of the Domanan tribe and had a population of 441 in 2021.
