= Özbek, İdil =

Village in Şırnak Province, Turkey

Özbek
- Village
- Location within Turkey
- Coordinates: 37.177°N 41.693°E
- Country: Turkey
- Province: Şırnak
- District: İdil
- Population (2021): 825
- Time zone: UTC+3 (TRT)

Özbek (Kurdish: Tilseqan; Syriac: Tal-Seqān) (Note: Also known as Tel-Sefan, Telsakam, Telsekan, or Telsakan.) is a village in the İdil District of Şırnak Province in Turkey. The village is populated by Kurds of the Botikan tribe and had a population of 825 in 2021.

The hamlet of Tuğlu is attached to Özbek.

== History ==
Tal-Seqān (today called Özbek) was historically inhabited by Syriac Orthodox Christians. In the Syriac Orthodox patriarchal register of dues of 1870, it was recorded that the village had 6 households, who paid 13 dues, and it did not have a church or a priest. In 1914, the village was populated by 300 Syriacs, according to the Assyro-Chaldean delegation to the Paris Peace Conference.

== Bibliography ==
- Bcheiry, Iskandar (2009). The Syriac Orthodox Patriarchal Register of Dues of 1870: An Unpublished Historical Document from the Late Ottoman Period. Gorgias Press.
- Gaunt, David (2006). Massacres, Resistance, Protectors: Muslim-Christian Relations in Eastern Anatolia during World War I. Gorgias Press.
- Jongerden, Joost; Verheij, Jelle, eds. (2012). Social Relations in Ottoman Diyarbekir, 1870-1915. Brill.
- Tan, Altan (2018). Turabidin'den Berriye'ye. Aşiretler - Dinler - Diller - Kültürler (in Turkish). Pak Ajans Yayincilik Turizm Ve Diş Ticaret Limited şirketi. ISBN 9789944360944.
