= Bozkır, İdil =

Village in Şırnak Province, Turkey

Bozkır
- Village
- Location within Turkey
- Coordinates: 37.364°N 41.624°E
- Country: Turkey
- Province: Şırnak
- District: İdil
- Population (2021): 278
- Time zone: UTC+3 (TRT)

Bozkır (Kurdish: Daskan) is a village in the İdil District of Şırnak Province in Turkey. The village is populated by Kurds of the Salihan tribe and had a population of 278 in 2021.
