= Akdağ, İdil =

Village in Şırnak Province, Turkey

Akdağ
- Village
- Location within Turkey
- Coordinates: 37.285°N 42.035°E
- Country: Turkey
- Province: Şırnak
- District: İdil
- Population (2021): 506
- Time zone: UTC+3 (TRT)

Akdağ (Kurdish: Zengilok) is a village in the İdil District of Şırnak Province in Turkey. The village is populated by Kurds of the Elîkan tribe and had a population of 506 in 2021.
