= Sarıköy, İdil =

Village in Şırnak Province, Turkey

Sarıköy
- Village
- Location within Turkey
- Coordinates: 37.286°N 41.622°E
- Country: Turkey
- Province: Şırnak
- District: İdil
- Population (2021): 53
- Time zone: UTC+3 (TRT)

Sarıköy (Arabic: ساري; Kurdish: Sarê; Syriac: ܣܰܐܪܗ, romanized: Sārī, (Note: Alternatively transliterated as Ī-Sārī, Sāre, Sare, or Sari.) or Syriac: ܐܣܬܝܪ, romanized: Estir) (Note: Alternatively transliterated as Estīr, Esther, or Istir. Also known as Gavayto, Gaveito, Gawayto, Gawoytō, or Gawoyto.) is a village in the İdil District of Şırnak Province in Turkey. The village is populated by Syriacs and had a population of 53 in 2021. It is located in the historic region of Tur Abdin.

In the village, there are churches of Mar Malke and Mort Shmuni.

== History ==
In the Syriac Orthodox patriarchal register of dues of 1870, it was recorded that Sārī (today called Sarıköy) had 47 households, who paid 136 dues, and was served by the Church of Morī Malkī and one priest. In 1914, it was inhabited by 300 Syriacs, according to the list presented to the Paris Peace Conference by the Assyro-Chaldean delegation. It was administered as part of the kaza (district) of Midyat. The Syriacs adhered to the Syriac Orthodox Church. The Syriacs were divided into fourteen clans and were historically under the patronage of the Kurdish Salihan tribe. Amidst the Sayfo, the Syriacs of Sārī took refuge at Basibrin.

The village had a population of 168 in 1960. There were 180 Turoyo-speaking Christians in 24 families at Sārī in 1966. There were 180 speakers of Turoyo in the village in 1984. In the late 20th century, Syriacs from Sārī emigrated to the Netherlands, Germany, and France. The last Syriac villagers left the village in 1994. Over 30 Syriac Orthodox families previously inhabited the village. It was subsequently occupied by village guards and their families with the agreement of the military. By 2004, about 30 Kurdish families inhabited the village. The village guards denied the Syriacs access to their homes and refused to leave and thus, in May 2004, Osman Güneş, the governor (Vali) of Şırnak, ordered them to leave the village. In 2007, the Turkish army was ordered to evict the Kurds who had illegally settled at Sārī. Eventually, the village guards left after having received approximately 70,000 Euros from the villagers in compensation. In the winter, the village is inhabited by only the Christian mukhtar.

== Demography ==
The following is a list of the number of Syriac families that have inhabited Sārī per year stated. Unless otherwise stated, all figures are from the list provided in The Syrian Orthodox Christians in the Late Ottoman Period and Beyond: Crisis then Revival, as noted in the bibliography below.

- 1915: 24
- 1966: 24
- 1978: 22
- 1979: 20
- 1981: 15
- 1987: 6
- 1995: 1

== Bibliography ==
- Andrews, Peter Alford; Benninghaus, Rüdiger, eds. (1989). Ethnic Groups in the Republic of Turkey.
- BarAbraham, Abdulmesih (2021). "Returning Home: The Ambivalent Assyrian Experience in Turkey". Poligrafi. 26 (101/102): 153–176. doi:10.35469/poligrafi.2021.282.
- Barsoum, Aphrem (2003). The Scattered Pearls: A History of Syriac Literature and Sciences. Translated by Matti Moosa (2nd ed.). Gorgias Press.
- Barsoum, Aphrem (2008). The History of Tur Abdin. Translated by Matti Moosa. Gorgias Press.
- Baz, Ibrahim (2016). Şırnak aşiretleri ve kültürü (in Turkish). ISBN 9786058849631.
- Bell, Gertrude (1982). The Churches and Monasteries of the Ṭur ʻAbdin. Pindar Press.
- Bcheiry, Iskandar (2009). The Syriac Orthodox Patriarchal Register of Dues of 1870: An Unpublished Historical Document from the Late Ottoman Period. Gorgias Press.
- Biner, Zerrin Özlem (2020). States of Dispossession: Violence and Precarious Coexistence in Southeast Turkey. University of Pennsylvania Press.
- Courtois, Sébastien de (2004). The Forgotten Genocide: Eastern Christians, The Last Arameans. Translated by Vincent Aurora. Gorgias Press.
- Courtois, Sébastien de (2013). "Tur Abdin : Réflexions sur l'état présent descommunautés syriaques du Sud-Est de la Turquie, mémoire, exils, retours". Cahier du Gremmamo (in French). 21: 113–150.
- Dinno, Khalid S. (2017). The Syrian Orthodox Christians in the Late Ottoman Period and Beyond: Crisis then Revival. Gorgias Press.
- Gaunt, David (2006). Massacres, Resistance, Protectors: Muslim-Christian Relations in Eastern Anatolia during World War I. Gorgias Press.
- Jongerden, Joost; Verheij, Jelle, eds. (2012). Social Relations in Ottoman Diyarbekir, 1870-1915. Brill.
- Palmer, Andrew (1990). Monk and Mason on the Tigris Frontier: The Early History of Tur Abdin. Cambridge University Press.
- Ritter, Hellmut (1967). Turoyo: Die Volkssprache der Syrischen Christen des Tur 'Abdin (in German). Vol. 1. Franz Steiner Verlag.
