= Ömür Gedik =

Turkish writer (born 1970)

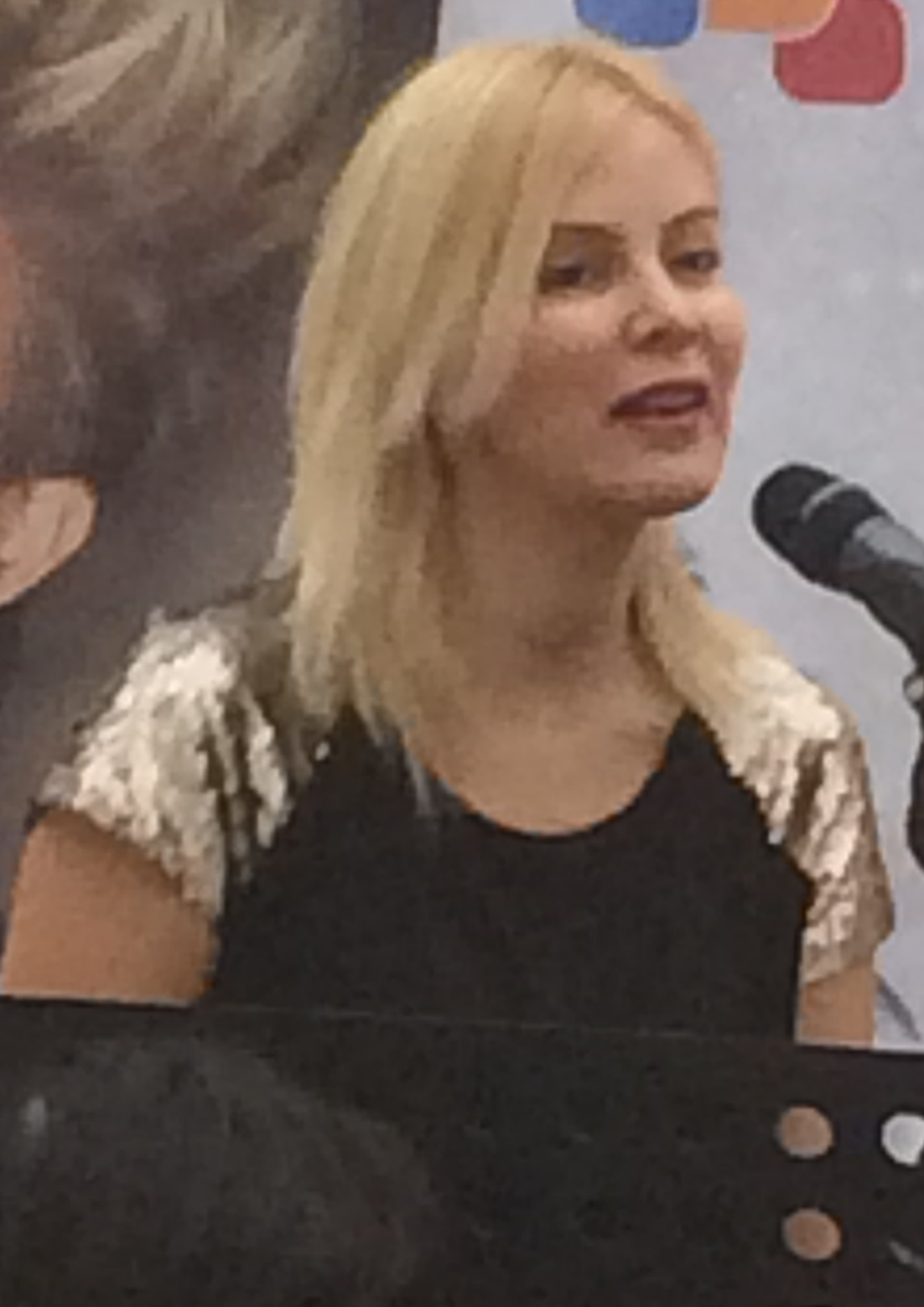
- Gedik in March 2016
- Born: 22 December 1970 (age 54)
- Education: Boğaziçi University
- Occupation(s): Artist, columnist, film critic
- Spouse: Soner Gedik (m. 1991; div. 2010)
- Children: 1
- Website: www.omurgedik.com.tr

Ömür Gedik (born 22 December 1970) is a Turkish journalist. She is a writer for Hürriyet newspaper, artist, animal rights advocate, a member of SİYAD (Association of Cinema Writers), and founder and president of HAÇİKO Association (The Association for the Protection of Animals from Desperation and Indifference).

== Education ==
In 1992, Gedik graduated from Boğaziçi University, with a degree in English Philology.

== Career ==
After graduating from university, Gedik joined the Sabah Journal Group, and in 1993 she started working for Hürriyet. She worked as an associate lecturer at Boğaziçi University, Preparatory Department, for 1 year. Gedik started working at Hürriyet Culture Art Service in 1999. She has a column in Hürriyet Kelebek where she mainly focuses on cinema. Gedik started her television career in 2004. She prepared and presented the program Stüdyo on TV8 for 1 year. In 2005, she began hosting Cinemania, a cinema program broadcast on Kanal D. She opened the 2012 International Antalya Film Festival.

== Recognition ==
- Kral Pop Special Award for her project "HAÇİKO" (18th Kral Music Awards)
- Most Popular Song of the Year (25th International Tüketici Summit)

== Animal rights ==
Anatole France had said 'Until one has loved an animal, a part of one's soul remains unawakened.' I want you to continue to support me in my effort to wake those who are asleep. I get this award not only for cats and dogs, but for all animals with hair or without hair, and on behalf of animal lovers.

— Gedik

Gedik draws attention with her work on animal rights. She is the founding president of the Association for Protection of Animals from Helplessness and Indifference (HAÇİKO). Gedik, took part in Prime Minister Recep Tayyip Erdoğan's meeting with animal lovers in February 2011. She works with HAYTAP on animal rights.

She appeared on the album Hop Dedik Orda Kal, released for the benefit of animals. Gedik duetted with Teoman on the song "Portakal Orda Kal", with Burak Kut on "Aşk Var Ya", and with Halil Sezai on "Paramparça".

== Personal life ==
Gedik has a daughter, named Tayga.

== Discography ==
EPs

- Ayrılık Töreni (2021)

Singles

- Portakal Orda Kal (with Teoman) (2011)
- Paramparça (with Halil Sezai) (2011)
- Aşk Var Ya (with Burak Kut) (2011)
- Neden Yoksun (2013)
- Kaliko (maxi single) (2013)
- Taht Kurmuş Kalbime (45 Yıllık Baba Şarkılar) (2013)
- Dokun Bana (with Umut Kuzey) (2014)
- Bekle Bekle (2014)
- Hey Onbeşli (2015)
- Karşılaşma (2015)
- Dillirga (2015)
- İlişki Durumu Çelişkide (feat. H. Yılmaz) (2015)
- Aşk Mı Dedin (maxi single) (2016)
- Sana Ne Kime Ne (with Yalçın Aşan) (2016)
- Gece Hayvanı (2017)
- Gözyaşlarım Anlatır (2018)
- Neredesin Sen (2018)
- Kulakların Çınlasın (feat. Yalçın Aşan) (2018)
- Aşka Bağlan (feat. Serdar Ortaç) (2018)
- Güneş Seninle Doğar (2019)
- Aşkım (Aşkın'ın Şarkıları) (2019)
- Manastırın Ortasında (Akustik) (2019)
- Resim (2019)
- Aramışsın (2019)
- Yıldızların Altında (feat. Tayfun) (2020)
- Mavrova (2020)
- Leylim Ley (feat. Rah) (2020)
- Bırakmam Seni (feat. Murat Başaran) (2020)
- Yaz Yağmuru (2020)
- İçimdeki Katil (feat. Ayhan Kavraz) (2020)
- İyi Bak Bana (2021)
- Unutmam (2021)
- Navaee (with Pedram Derakhshani) (2022)
- Deli Oluyorlar (2022)
- Yürek Haini (2022)
- Rüzgarın Ardında (feat. Pedram Derakhshani) (2022)
- Tutuşmak İstiyorum (with Mert Akyol) (2022)
- Pazara Kadar (2023)
- Yoksa Sen Beni (with Aksel) (2023)
- Seni Gidi Vurdumduymaz (2023)
- İs ve Duman (2024)
- Filozof (2024)
- Özlüyorum İkimizi (2024)
