= Hendekköy, İdil =

Village in Şırnak Province, Turkey

Hendekköy
- Village
- Location within Turkey
- Coordinates: 37.397°N 42.059°E
- Country: Turkey
- Province: Şırnak
- District: İdil
- Population (2021): 140
- Time zone: UTC+3 (TRT)

Hendekköy (Kurdish: Xendek; Syriac: Ḫandaq) (Note: Alternatively transliterated as Handek, Hendek, Kendek, or Khandaq.) is a village in the İdil District of Şırnak Province in Turkey. The village is populated by Kurds of the Harunan tribe and had a population of 140 in 2021.

== History ==
Ḫandaq (today called Hendekköy) was historically inhabited by Syriac Orthodox Christians and Chaldean Catholics. In the Syriac Orthodox patriarchal register of dues of 1870, it was recorded that the village had 8 households, who paid 15 dues, and it did not have a church or a priest. In 1914, there were 100 Syriacs, according to the list presented to the Paris Peace Conference by the Assyro-Chaldean delegation. It was located in the kaza of Jazirat Ibn ʿUmar. The Chaldean Catholics were served by the Chaldean Catholic diocese of Gazarta. Kurds of the Mamman tribe attacked the village on 19 June 1915 and massacred the villagers amidst the Sayfo. It was subsequently usurped by Kurds.

== Bibliography ==
- Baz, Ibrahim (2016). Şırnak aşiretleri ve kültürü (in Turkish). ISBN 9786058849631.
- Bcheiry, Iskandar (2009). The Syriac Orthodox Patriarchal Register of Dues of 1870: An Unpublished Historical Document from the Late Ottoman Period. Gorgias Press.
- Courtois, Sébastien de (2004). The Forgotten Genocide: Eastern Christians, The Last Arameans. Translated by Vincent Aurora. Gorgias Press.
- Gaunt, David (2006). Massacres, Resistance, Protectors: Muslim-Christian Relations in Eastern Anatolia during World War I. Gorgias Press.
- Jongerden, Joost; Verheij, Jelle, eds. (2012). Social Relations in Ottoman Diyarbekir, 1870-1915. Brill.
- Tan, Altan (2018). Turabidin'den Berriye'ye. Aşiretler - Dinler - Diller - Kültürler (in Turkish). ISBN 9789944360944.
