= İdil District =

District in Şırnak Province, Turkey

- District
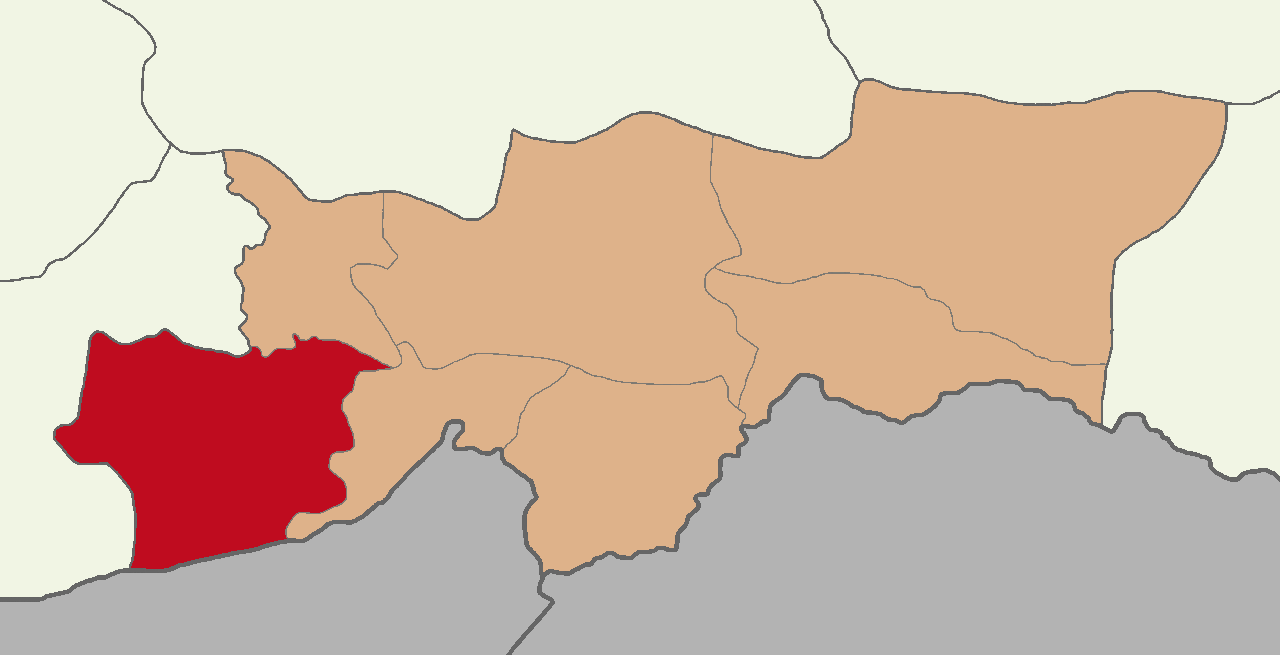
- Map showing İdil District in Şırnak Province

- Location in Turkey
- Coordinates: 37°18′N 41°50′E
- Country: Turkey
- Province: Şırnak
- Seat: İdil
- Area: 1,148 km^{2} (443 sq mi)
- Population (2021): 77,105
  - Density: 67/km^{2} (170/sq mi)
- Time zone: UTC+3 (TRT)

İdil District is a district of the Şırnak Province of Turkey. The seat of the district is the town of İdil and the population was 77,105 in 2021. Its area is 1,148 km^{2}.

The district was formed in 1937.

The western part of the district is considered part of the Tur Abdin region, while the eastern part is considered part of the Bohtan region.

== Settlements ==
İdil District contains three beldes, sixty-five villages, of which three are unpopulated, and nineteen hamlets.

=== Beldes ===
1. İdil
2. Karalar (Eraban)
3. Sırtköy (Tilêla)

=== Villages ===
1. Açma (Xirabê Sosîna)
2. Akdağ (Zengilok)
3. Akkoyunlu (Bezîkîr)
4. Aksoy (Memolan)
5. Alakamış (Eleqamiş)
6. Başakköy (Basaqê)
7. Bereketli (Fîl)
8. Bozburun (Zinarex)
9. Bozkır (Daskan)
10. Çığır (Serkanî)
11. Çınarlı (Kekwan)
12. Çukurlu (Xenduk)
13. Dirsekli (Xirabê Şeref)
14. Dumanlı (Kefsur)
15. Duruköy (Danêrê)
16. Gedik (Dîpik)
17. Güzelova (Xana Haso)
18. Haberli (Basîbrîn)
19. Hendekköy (Xendek)
20. Işık (Xaltan)
21. Kaşıkçı (Heskal)
22. Kayalı (Kefşîn)
23. Kayı (Hêdil)
24. Kentli (Bazgur)
25. Kırca (Avdika)
26. Kozluca (Xanikê)
27. Köyceğiz (Dupîç)
28. Kurtuluş (Batil)
29. Kuyulu (Selekûn)
30. Mağaraköy (Kiweh)
31. Ocaklı (Banih)
32. Okçu (Sivik)
33. Okçu (Xiraba Dêrika)
34. Ortaköy (Şêx Hesen)
35. Oyalı (Delavê Qesrê)
36. Oymak (Rîzok)
37. Ozan (Mijdîn)
38. Öğündük (Midin, Mihih)
39. Özbek (Tilseqan)
40. Özen (Xirabê Tuwa)
41. Peçenek (Mirik)
42. Pınarbaşı (Aynserê)
43. Sarıköy (Estero, Sare)
44. Sulak (Bafê)
45. Tekeköy (Xirabê Nêriyan)
46. Tepecik (Seregir)
47. Tepeköy (Xerabê Ripin)
48. Toklu (Axrit)
49. Topraklı (Xwarikê)
50. Uçarlı (Temerz)
51. Uğrak (Xirabê Mişa)
52. Ulak (Fîlfel)
53. Üçok (Babek)
54. Varımlı (Qere Xirab)
55. Yağmurca (Xêlanî)
56. Yalaz (Arzanex)
57. Yarbaşı (Hespîst)
58. Yavşan (Zergos)
59. Yayalar (Soran)
60. Yaylaköy
61. Yazman (Hecîkesan)
62. Yolaçan (Narîncî)
63. Yörük (Dikê)
64. Yuvalı (Xandex)
65. Yuvalı (Barim)
