= Gedik, İdil =

Village in Şırnak Province, Turkey

Gedik
- Village
- Location within Turkey
- Coordinates: 37.141°N 41.807°E
- Country: Turkey
- Province: Şırnak
- District: İdil
- Population (2021): 156
- Time zone: UTC+3 (TRT)

Gedik (Kurdish: Dîpik) is a village in the İdil District of Şırnak Province in Turkey. The village is populated by Kurds of the Hesinan tribe and had a population of 156 in 2021.
