= Köyceğiz, İdil =

Village in Şırnak Province, Turkey

Köyceğiz
- Village
- Location within Turkey
- Coordinates: 37.180°N 41.878°E
- Country: Turkey
- Province: Şırnak
- District: İdil
- Population (2021): 960
- Time zone: UTC+3 (TRT)

Köyceğiz (Kurdish: Dupîç) is a village in the İdil District of Şırnak Province in Turkey. The village is populated by Kurds of the Hesinan tribe and had a population of 960 in 2021.
