= Kozluca, İdil =

Village in Şırnak Province, Turkey

Kozluca
- Village
- Location within Turkey
- Coordinates: 37.133°N 41.691°E
- Country: Turkey
- Province: Şırnak
- District: İdil
- Population (2021): 655
- Time zone: UTC+3 (TRT)

Kozluca (Kurdish: Xanik) is a village in the İdil District of Şırnak Province in Turkey. The village is populated by Kurds of the Dasikan tribe and had a population of 655 in 2021.

The two hamlets of İnci and Yeşilce are attached to Kozluca.
