= Haberli, İdil =

Village in Şırnak Province, Turkey

Haberli
- Village
- Location within Turkey
- Coordinates: 37.309°N 41.621°E
- Country: Turkey
- Province: Şırnak
- District: İdil
- Population (2024): 162
- Time zone: UTC+3 (TRT)

Haberli, also known by its Syriac name Bsorino (Syriac: ܒܝܬ ܣܒܝܪܝܢܐ, lit. 'Beth Sbirino', or 'Bsorino',) is a village in the İdil District of Şırnak Province in Turkey.

In the village is the Mor Barsaumo Monastery and the churchs of Mor Dodo, Mor Eseyo, Mor Kavmi, Mor Tuma, and Mor Salito. The village is inhabited by a mixed population of Kurds and Assyrians/Syriacs, (Note: The terms "Assyrian" and "Syriac" are used to refer to the same people) and has a population of 162 as of 2024. The village is also known for its viticulture and unique architectural designs.

== Etymology ==
The Syriac name for the village means "house of hope".

== History ==
=== Early history ===
The majority of the village's population is religiously Syriac Orthodox, but there were also a few Catholics living in the village as well. Little is known about the village's history before the 1st century BC, but it was likely that it was Christianized during the 1st century AD.

In the 9th century BC, the Assyrian king Ashurnasirpal II and his successor Shalmaneser III both described passing the Pass of Ištarāte on marches with their armies, which has been identified with the pass near Haberli. The pass is now a road that connects Azakh and Midyat together. It has been suggested that the village was founded by a member of the Roman limitanei (frontier militia) named Constans in the 4th century AD, alongside the village of Beth Kustan.

Throughout its history, the village of Bsbirino has been a site of monastical activity for the Syriac Orthodox Church, retaining significant Christian heritage. For example, Ignatius Aphrem I, the former patriarch of the church, states that eleven letters belonging to Mor Yakup were found on thirty large papers which are now on display in the London Museum, some of which also offering insight into theological manners such as the process of baptism. In Syriac Christian encyclopedias, there exists records of the priest Isaiah of Bet Sbirino (Syriac: ܐܫܥܝܐ ܣܒܝܪܝܢܝܐ), who authored two poems on the ravage of Tamerlane in Tur Abdin. Today, 25 churches remain in the region where the village lies, and churches and monasteries affiliated with the SOC were the main religious sites until the first mosque was built in the 1970s. Many of the village's churches date back to the 8th century.

=== Modern history ===
Haberli is a village of thirty clans who historically were under the patronage of Kurds of the Salihan tribe. Some families consider themselves members of the Salihan tribe.

The Mor Salito Church was built in 1915. During the events of Sayfo, an attack was made on the village in 1915, but it was unsuccessful. The village was attacked once again two years later, which killed most of the survivors of the 1915 attacks. Ottoman archival documents suggest that Syriac Christians in the village had revolted against authorities, however no tangible evidence of this has surfaced. Many of the villagers fled by night, similarly to Midun.

The village is also said to be where the Haydo family originates from. Shamoun Hanne Haydo, a clan leader who is well known for defending his community during the genocide, is said to have originated from Bsirino, and is where he died. The village fell under attack from a Kurdish Agha after Haydo finished his education, which caused a full scale attack to be led by a group of Kurds; however, this attack would eventually be successfully resisted by Haydo. Haydo's brother, Melke Hanne Haydo, would also coordinate with sympathetic Kurdish tribal leaders to defend the village during the Defence of Iwardo.

In 1936, the church of Mor Dodo received repairs. Since the founding of the modern Republic of Turkey, the village has previously been the site of several human rights violations against the Syriac community (ex. occupation of immovable property), and the villagers continue to receive hostility and threats from the local Kurdish and Muslim population. Minority Rights Group International reported that Assyrians originally from the village had several of their lands registered by non-Assyrian owners illegally and without their consultation, something that also affected the village of Kafro Tahtoyo. Assyrians who have shown interest in returning to the village following emigration were intimidated by village guards, with no interception from the Turkish Armed Forces. This has resulted in an increased exodus outside of the village over the years, which has in some cases reduced the economy from viticulture profits. Most of the population have since migrated to Germany and the European diaspora, and 23 households remained in the village as of 2016.

In 1994, Melke Tok, a priest from the village had been abducted before conducting a wedding ceremony. News of the priest's kidnapping had reached villagers who were gathering at the Mor Gabriel Monastery to celebrate the ordination of two monks. It's believed that his kidnappers were supporters of the group Hezbollah; Tok succeeded in escaping following an experience of premature burial, and stated that he was pressured to convert to Islam.

In 1990, the village was transferred from the province of Mardin to Şırnak; following Law No. 5747 enacted by the Ministry of the Interior, the village would lose its status as a sub-district. In 2023, the governor of Şırnak Cevdet Atay visited the village, inspecting the Assyrian guesthouse and meeting with both villagers and the headsmen, Shamoun Güzel.

== Demographics ==
In 1984, there were 900 speakers of the Turoyo dialect of Neo-Aramaic.

Historical population
Year	Pop.	±% p.a.
1965	775	—
1985	290	−4.80%
1990	185	−8.60%
1997	125	−5.45%
2007	156	+2.24%
2012	153	−0.39%
2017	173	+2.49%
2022	171	−0.23%
2024	162	−2.67%
Source: Population census (1965-1997) and TÜİK (2007-2024)

== Bibliography ==
- Atto, Naures; Gaunt, David; Barthoma, Soner O. (2017). "Sayfo, Firman, Qafle: The First World War from the Perspective of Syriac Christians". Let Them Not Return: Sayfo – The Genocide Against the Assyrian, Syriac, and Chaldean Christians in the Ottoman Empire. Berghahn Books. pp. 132–147. doi:10.2307/j.ctvw049wf. ISBN 9781785334993.
- BarAbraham, Abdulmesih (2021). "Returning Home: The Ambivalent Assyrian Experience in Turkey". Poligrafi. 26 (101/102): 153–176.
- Barsoum, Aphrem (2003). The Scattered Pearls: A History of Syriac Literature and Sciences. Translated by Matti Moosa (2nd ed.). Gorgias Press.
- Günaysu, Ayşe (2019). Safety Of The Life Of Nun Verde Gökmen In The Village Zaz (Izbirak) — Midyat, Tur Abdin – And The General Social Situation Of The Assyrian Villages In The Region (PDF) (Report). Translated by Abdulmesih BarAbraham. Human Rights Association Commission Against Racism and Discrimination.
- Palmer, Andrew (1990). Monk and Mason on the Tigris Frontier: The Early History of Tur Abdin. Cambridge University Press.
- Radner, Karen (2006). "How to Reach the Upper Tigris: The Route Through the Tur Abdin" (PDF). State Archives of Assyria Bulletin. 15. Padova, Italy: 273–305. ISSN 1120-4699.
- Sami, Kamuran; Karakaş, Berrin (June 2016). "TUR ABDİN BÖLGESİ'NDE YERLEŞİK SÜRYANİLERİN YER, ZAMAN VE SOSYO-KÜLTÜREL BAĞLAMDA KIRSAL MİMARİLERİ: MİDYAT-HABERLİ (BASIBİRN) KÖYÜ ÖRNEĞİ" [RURAL ARCHITECTURES OF ASSYRIANS SETTLED IN TUR ABDIN REGION IN THE CONTEXT OF LOCATION, TIME AND SOCIO-CULTURE: THE CASE OF MIDYAT-HABERLİ (BASIBİRN) VILLAGE] (PDF). The Journal of International Social Research (in Turkish). 9 (44): 692–715.
- Sims, Michael (2023). ‘Without a Purpose, Misfortune Will Befall Our Land:’ Discourses of Nation in Late Ottoman Kurdistan (Thesis). University of Washington.
- Tan, Altan (2018). Turabidin'den Berriye'ye. Aşiretler - Dinler - Diller - Kültürler (in Turkish). Pak Ajans Yayincilik Turizm Ve Diş Ticaret Limited şirketi. ISBN 9789944360944.
- Travis, Hannibal (20 July 2017). The Assyrian Genocide: Cultural and Political Legacies. Vol. 29. Routledge. doi:10.4324/9781315269832-6. ISBN 9781351980258.
- Yildiz, İrfan; Koç, Erkan (16 May 2010). "İdil'deki Süryani Kiliselerinden Birkaç Örnek" [A Few Examples of Assyrian Churches in İdil] (in Turkish): 343–364.
