= İdil =

Town in Şırnak Province, Turkey

- Municipality
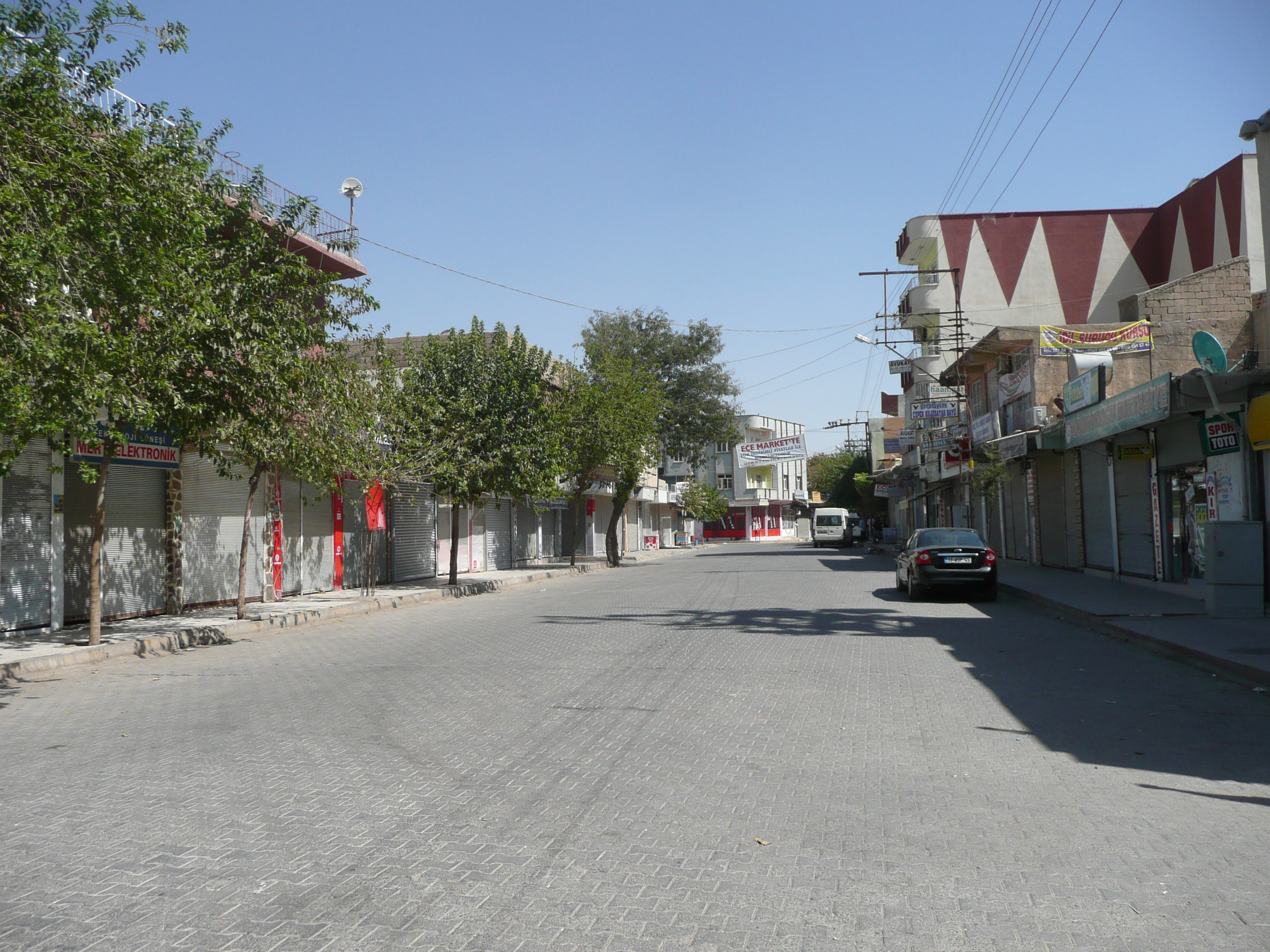

- Location in Turkey
- Coordinates: 37.341°N 41.894°E
- Country: Turkey
- Province: Şırnak
- District: İdil

Government
  - Mayor: Türkan Kayır (Independent)
- Population (2021): 30,271
- Time zone: UTC+3 (TRT)
- Website: www.idil.bel.tr

İdil (Syriac: ܐܙܟ, romanized: Azakh, (Note: Alternatively transliterated as Hazakh, Azekh, Hazak, or Azék.) or Beth Zabday, Kurdish: Hezex, Arabic: آزخ, romanized: Azekh) is a city and seat of the İdil District of the Şırnak Province in Turkey. It is located in the historical region of Tur Abdin. The town had a population of 30,271 in 2021 and is composed of Kurds of the Domanan, Dorikan, Harunan, Meman and Omerkan tribes. The town was once home to a large number of Assyrians/Syriacs, however, only a few families remain today.

In the city, there is a Syriac Orthodox Church of the Mother of God (Arabic: كنيسة العذراء, Turkish: Meryem Ana Kilisesi).

== History ==
Azakh (today called İdil) is identified as the town of Ashikhu, or Asiḫu, which is earliest attested in an administrative note from the governor's archive at Tell Halaf, during the reign of Adad-nirari III, King of Assyria, in the late 9th and early 8th century BC. Azakh was later conflated with the neighbouring city of Bezabde, and led to its alternative Syriac name Beth Zabday.

=== Ottoman Empire ===
Muhammad Pasha, Emir of Rawandiz, took advantage of the disruption caused to the Ottoman Empire by the Egyptian Muhammad Ali's invasion of Syria in 1831–1832 to expand his realm, and besieged Azakh in 1834. The emir surrendered, however, upon the arrival of a large Ottoman army under the leadership of Reşid Mehmed Pasha. The village was attacked again later by Bedir Khan Beg, Emir of Bohtan, in 1847, resulting in the death of Cyril George, Syriac Orthodox Archbishop of Azakh, a priest, and eight congregants.

==== Defense of Azakh ====
At the beginning of the 20th century, the village had a population of 1000, and was inhabited by Arabic-speaking Syriac Orthodox and Syriac Catholic Christians, some of whom emigrated to Brazil in 1914. Amidst the Sayfo, in July 1915, refugees from the villages of Esfes, Kefshenne, Kufakh, Babqqa, and Khaddel fled to Azakh. The village was subsequently attacked by Kurdish tribesmen from mid-August until their withdrawal on 9 September. An expeditionary force of approximately 8000 Ottoman soldiers and Kurdish auxiliaries, led jointly by Max Erwin von Scheubner-Richter and Ömer Naci, was diverted from its original task to conduct anti-Russian operations in Iran to besiege Azakh, and arrived in late October. Scheubner-Richter refused to involve Germans in the siege, and the first attack began on 7 November. After subsequent attacks, and a Syriac counter-attack on 14 November, the Turkish army retreated on 21 November.

=== Republic of Turkey ===
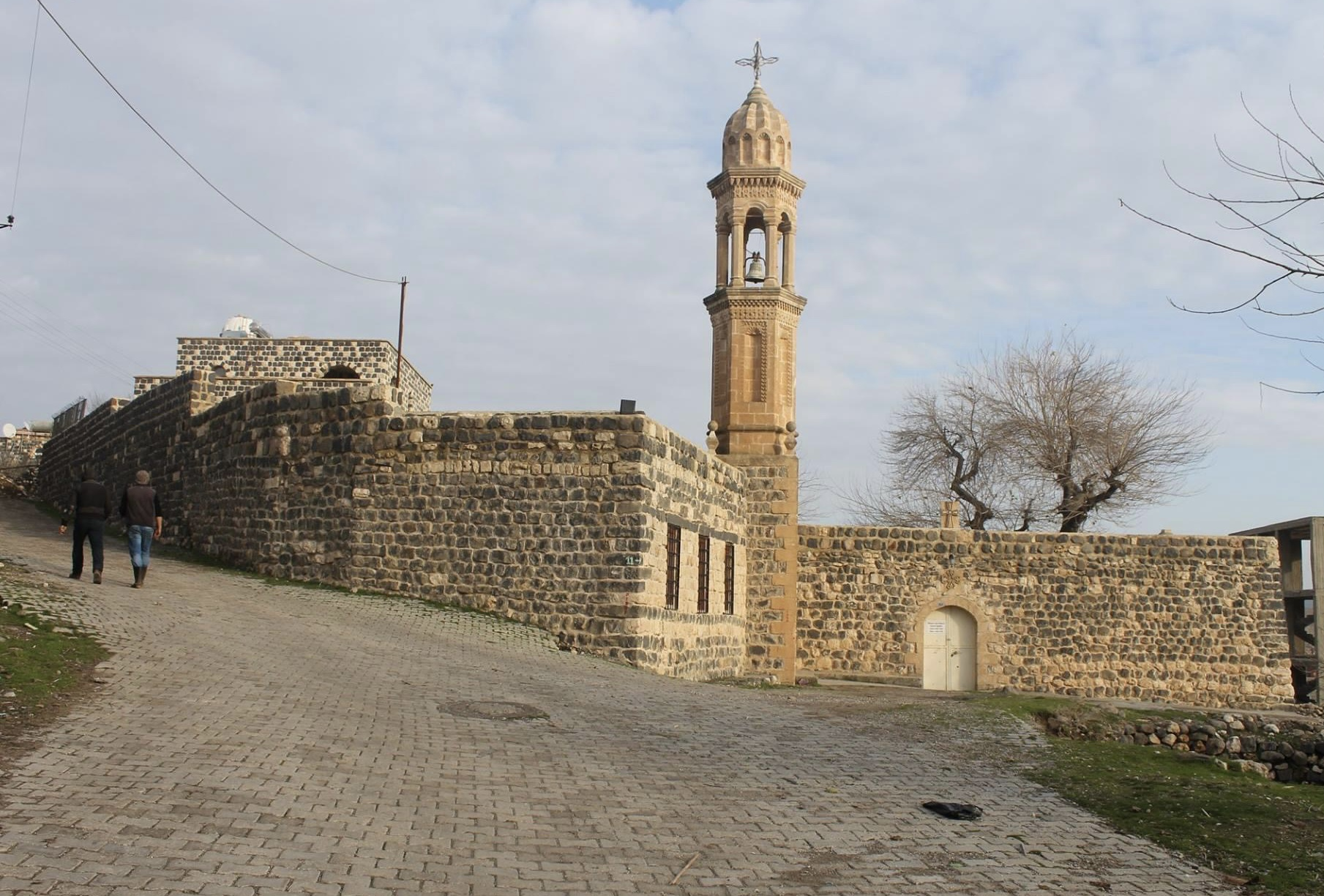
Syriac Orthodox Church in İdil.

The village became the seat of a bucak (subdistrict) of Cizre in 1924. In the following year, a number of villagers emigrated to Brazil, at which time 100 Syriacs were deported from Azakh. In the aftermath of the failure of the Kurdish Sheikh Said rebellion, the Turkish government enacted oppressive measures, thus in 1926 the inhabitants of Azakh were accused of complicity in the rebellion, and of possession of arms received from the British government. The Turkish authorities alleged that the village's men had served in the British Iraq Levies on the basis of the discovery of British rifles and permits to carry arms in English and Arabic in Azakh. The population was thus disarmed after the arrival of 1500 Turkish soldiers, and 257 or 357 men from Azakh and neighbouring villages, including notables and three priests, were accused of treason, arrested, and imprisoned at Cizre. The Syriacs of Azakh were deemed unsuitable for Turkification by the Turkish government, and as a result aimed to exterminate those who had survived the genocide, whereby those who had been arrested were beaten and denied food whilst imprisoned. They were later transferred to Midyat, where most were released in August 1926, whilst notables remained imprisoned, who were transferred to Harpoot until eventually released after five more months.

Syriacs from Azakh emigrated to Ain Diwar and Al-Malikiyah in northeastern Syria in the early 1930s after the construction of French military bases. The village was elevated to district in 1937, upon which it was officially renamed İdil. The village was inhabited by 3500 Syriacs in 1964. As a result of the Cypriot crisis of 1963-1964, Syriacs of İdil were the victim of anti-Christian riots. The village was exclusively populated by Syriacs until the mid-1970s; this was in part due to the prohibition of sale of property to Muslim Kurds by Mayor Şükrü Tutuş. Efforts to encroach on the Syriac population resulted in the construction of social housing for Kurds in the village, who consequently amounted to 10% of the population, and the election of Abdurrahman Abay, chief of the Kurdish Kecan tribe, as mayor in 1979 with the aid of the Turkish authorities, including the military commander, judge, and district governor. Abay alleged that he received congratulations via telegram from Anwar Sadat, President of Egypt, for the "Muslim conquest of Idil". This led the Syriac population to decline in the 1970s and 1980s.

After their forced eviction by the Turkish army on 20 November 1993, a number of Syriac refugees from Hassana fled to İdil. On 9 January 1994, Melke Tok, priest of Miden, was abducted whilst en route from İdil to Bsorino. The priest was later released after negotiations, and attested that, whilst in captivity, he was buried alive and pressured into converting to Islam. The murder of former mayor Şükrü Tutuş on 17 June 1994 led the remaining Christian population of several hundred people to seek asylum in Western Europe, and was followed by the Kurdish repopulation of the village. Syriacs later returned, but by 2015 only 50 inhabited the city.

The eruption of violence in early 2016 led all but two Syriacs to flee İdil, as well as an estimated three thousand people, and a curfew was imposed on 16 February. The Turkish army began operations in the city on 18 February and claimed to have killed at least 47 PKK militants by 25 February. The curfew was partially lifted on 31 March and the refugees returned to İdil, including at least four Syriac families. In late July 2019, Syriac properties in the district were struck by suspected arson attacks. As of September 2020, only 23 Syriacs inhabit İdil.

== Government ==
The town is divided into the six neighbourhoods of Aşağı, Atakent, Turgut Özal, Yeni and Yukarı.

=== Mayors ===
Election	Mayor	Party
2024	Türkan Kayır	DEM Party
2019	Songül Erdem	HDP
2014	Mehmet Muhdi Arslan	BDP
2009	Resul Sadak	DTP
2004	Resul Sadak	SHP
1994	Murat Dalmış	DYP
1979	Abdurrahman Abay	ANAP
1966	Şükrü Tutuş	ANAP

Mayor Mehmet Muhdi Arslan and deputy mayor Nevin Girasun were suspended on 20 September 2016 following their arrest in August on suspicion of aiding and abetting the PKK, and Kaymakam (district governor) Ersin Tepeli was appointed as trustee on the following day.

== Notable people ==
- Jacques Behnan Hindo (b. 1941), Syriac Catholic Archbishop of Al-Hasakah-Nisibis.

== Bibliography ==
- Abdalla, Michael (2017). Dżihad w praktyce : Asyryjczycy miejscowości Azach (Azakh) w Górnej Mezopotamii w latach I wojny światowej : opór, ugoda, zdemilitaryzowanie, exodus [Jihad in Practice. The Assyrians of Azakh in Upper Mesopotamia during World War I: Resistance, Agreement, Demilitarization, and Exodus]. Wydział Prawa, Administracji i Ekonomii Uniwersytetu Wrocławskiego. pp. 141–186.
- Abdalla, Michael (2018). "The term Seyfo in historical perspective". In Hannibal Travis (ed.). The Assyrian Genocide: Cultural and Political Legacies. Routledge. pp. 92–105.
- Altuġ, Seda (2011). Sectarianism in the Syrian Jazira: Community, land and violence in the memories of World War I and the French mandate (1915- 1939). Utrecht University. hdl:1874/205821.
- Atto, Naures (2011). Hostages in the Homeland, Orphans in the Diaspora: Identity Discourses Among the Assyrian/Syriac Elites in the European Diaspora (PDF). Leiden University Press.
- Avcıkıran, Adem (2009). Kürtçe Anamnez, Anamneza bi Kurmancî.
- Bardakci, M.; Freyberg-Inan, A.; Giesel, C.; Leisse, O. (2017). Religious Minorities in Turkey: Alevi, Armenians, and Syriacs and the Struggle to Desecuritize Religious Freedom. Palgrave Macmillan UK. ISBN 978-1-137-27026-9.
- Barsoum, Aphrem (2003). The Scattered Pearls: A History of Syriac Literature and Sciences. Translated by Matti Moosa (2nd ed.). Gorgias Press.
- Barsoum, Aphrem (2008). History of the Za'faran Monastery. Translated by Matti Moosa. Gorgias Press.
- Biner, Zerrin Ozlem (2019). States of Dispossession: Violence and Precarious Coexistence in Southeast Turkey. University of Pennsylvania Press.
- Dadrian, Vahakn N. (2002). "The Armenian Question and the Wartime Fate of the Armenians as Documented by the Officials of the Ottoman Empire's World War I Allies: Germany and Austria-Hungary". International Journal of Middle East Studies. 34 (1): 59–85. doi:10.1017/S0020743802001034.
- DelCogliano, Mark (2006). "Syriac Monasticism in Tur Abdin: A Present-Day Account". Cistercian Studies Quarterly. 41 (3): 311–349.
- Güsten, Susanne (2016). A Farewell to Tur Abdin (PDF).
- Jongerden, Joost; Verheij, Jelle (2012). Social Relations in Ottoman Diyarbekir, 1870-1915. Brill.
- Joseph, John (1984). Muslim-Christian Relations and Inter-Christian Rivalries in the Middle East: The Case of the Jacobites in an Age of Transition. SUNY Press.
- Palmer, Andrew (1990). Monk and Mason on the Tigris Frontier: The Early History of Tur Abdin. Cambridge University Press.
- Radner, Karen (2006). "How to reach the Upper Tigris: The route through the Tur Abdin" (PDF). State Archives of Assyria Bulletin. 15: 273–305.
- Sato, Noriko (2001). Memory and Social Identity among Syrian Orthodox Christians (PDF).
- Sinclair, T.A. (1989). Eastern Turkey: An Architectural & Archaeological Survey, Volume III. Pindar Press. ISBN 9780907132349.
