= Yerköy, Nusaybin =

Village in Mardin Province, Turkey

Yerköy
- Neighbourhood
- Location in Turkey
- Coordinates: 37.104°N 41.536°E
- Country: Turkey
- Province: Mardin
- District: Nusaybin
- Population (2021): 272
- Time zone: UTC+3 (TRT)

Yerköy (Kurdish: Binerdkê; Syriac: Beţ ‘Andarkī) (Note: Alternatively spelt as Ban'ardakī.) is a neighbourhood in the municipality and district of Nusaybin, Mardin Province in Turkey. It is populated by Kurds of the Bêcirmanî tribe and had a population of 272 in 2021.

== History ==
Beţ ‘Andarkī (today called Yerköy) was historically inhabited by Syriac Orthodox Christians. In the Syriac Orthodox patriarchal register of dues of 1870, it was recorded that the village had 13 households, who paid 36 dues, and had one priest without a church.

== See also ==
- Ocaklı, Nusaybin

== Bibliography ==
- Bcheiry, Iskandar (2009). The Syriac Orthodox Patriarchal Register of Dues of 1870: An Unpublished Historical Document from the Late Ottoman Period. Gorgias Press.
- Bcheiry, Iskandar (2010). Collection of Historical Documents in Relation with the Syriac Orthodox Community in the Late Period of the Ottoman Empire: The Register of Mardin MS 1006. Gorgias Press.
- Tan, Altan (2018). Turabidin'den Berriye'ye. Aşiretler - Dinler - Diller - Kültürler (in Turkish). Pak Ajans Yayincilik Turizm Ve Diş Ticaret Limited şirketi. ISBN 9789944360944.
