= Arjen Arî =

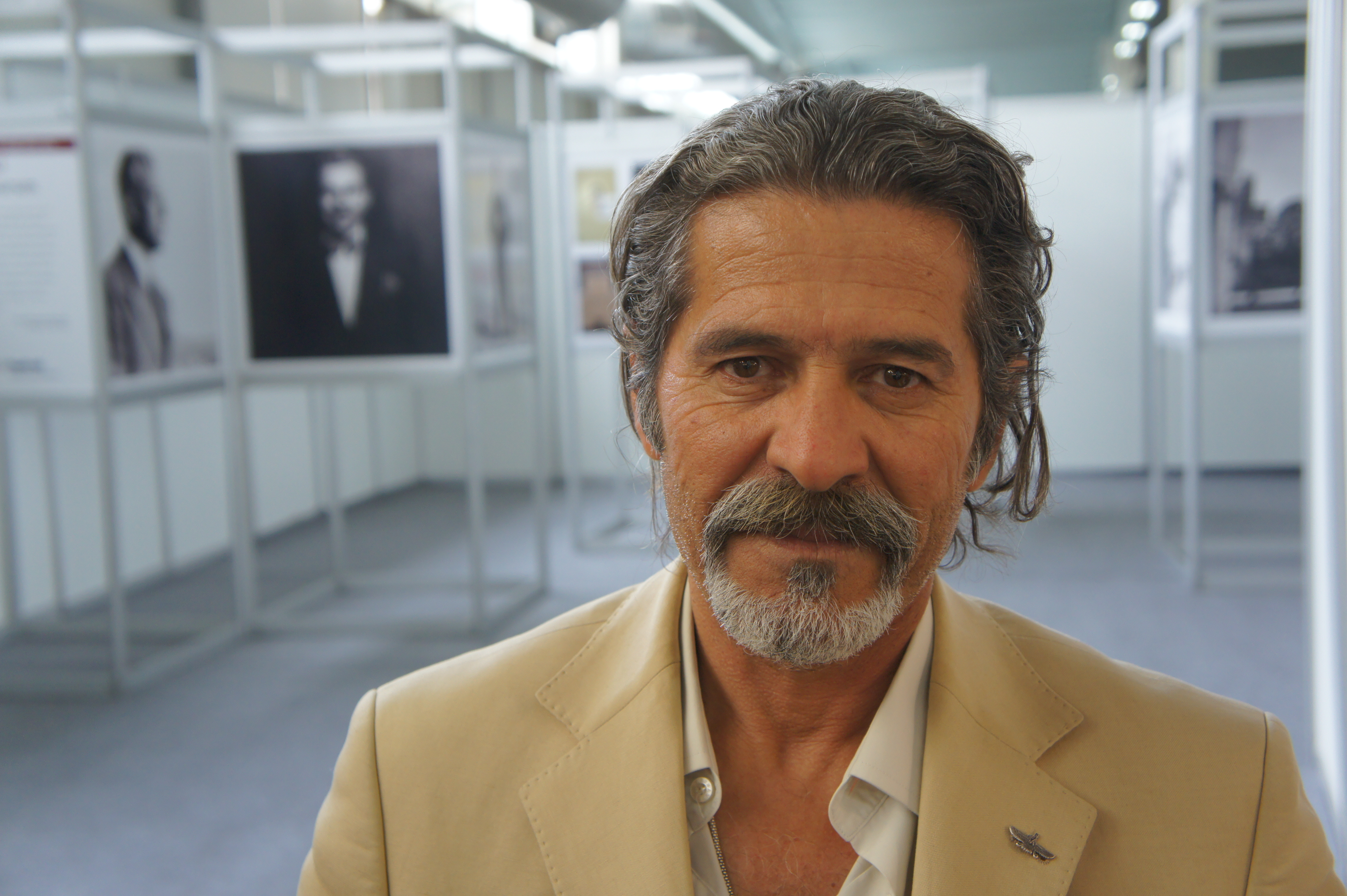
- The Kurdish poet Arjen Arî, May 2012 in Amed/Diyarbakir
- Born: 1956; Çalê
- Died: 30 October 2012 (aged 55–56); Amed/Diyarbakir
- Occupations: Poet, writer, journalist
- Writing career
- Literary movement: The generation of Kurdish poets emerging after 2000

Arjen Arî (1956 in Nusaybin, Turkey – 30 October 2012 in Amed/Diyarbakir) was a contemporary Kurdish poet and writer.

== Biography ==
Arjen Arî was born in 1956 in the Omeriyan region, in the village of Çalê. In 1979, he graduated from the Diyarbakır Education Institute, Turkish language department.

He was born in the village of Çalê in the Nusaybin District of Turkey. He graduated from the Turkish department of Diyarbakir College of Education in 1979. He was arrested for one week on charges of owning and distributing Kurdish and Turkish political pamphlets in 1976. At that time, police confiscated his poems in both Turkish and Kurdish. He was released, but his poems are still held in the Nusaybin Courthouse archive.

His writings have appeared in many Kurdish literary magazines including: Tîrêj, Berbang, Nûdem, Çira, Pelîn, and Rewşen. After being attacked by unidentified gunmen in 1992, he moved to Diyarbakir where he lived till his death.

He was one of the founders of the Kurdish Writers Association in 2004 and he served as its public relations officer.

== Later life ==
In 1992, in the Nusaybin district, he was subjected to an armed attack at his doorstep and was taken injured to Dicle University Hospital. From that event, Arjen Arî lived in Diyarbakır.

He had been receiving treatment in hospital for cancer for some time, died on October 30, 2012 in Diyarbakır. His grave is in Diyarbakır Cemetery. After his death, through the efforts of his family and Sor Publications, a Poetry Competition was established in his name, and each year one poet receives the award from the jury. Sor Publications collected all his poems in a set in 2019.

== Books ==
1. Ramûsan min veşartin li geliyekî, Poems, Avesta Publishers, 2000.
2. Ev çiya rûspî ne, Poems, Avesta Publishers, 2002.
3. Destana Kawa, Novel, Elma Publishers, 2003.
4. Eroûtîka, Poems, Lis Publishers, 2006.
5. Bakûrê Helbestê / Antolojiya Helbesta Bakûr (Anthology of Northern Kurdish Poetry), Union of Kurdish Writers of Duhok Publishers, 2008.
6. Şêrgele, Poems, Avesta Publishers, 2008.

== His literary works and individual poems ==
- 1980 Today Again, This Roman Soldier and Come, under the name O. Dara, Tîrêj, 2.
- 1992 The Story of Thirteen Nights and Thirteen Days, Nûdem, 2.
- 1992 September Morning and Çarîn, Nûdem, 3.
- 1994 Little Dove and Masîko, Nûdem, 10.
- 1994 Boy and Flowers of Late Spring, Nûdem, 11.
- 1995 I Am Not an Idol Worshipper, Çira, 3.
- 1995 I Am a Communist, Nûdem, 16.
- 1996 Wargeh, Çira, 5.
- 1997 Dilodîn, Nûdem, 21.
- 1997 Don't Forget, Çarîn and Until Another Spring, Nûdem, 24.
- 1998 Letter, Nûdem, 28.
- 2000 My Turn Has Fallen to Xozat, Nûdem, 34.
- 2007 I Lifted My Head, Nûbûn, 94.
- 2008 A Little Childhood, Nûbûn, 98.
- 2008 A Sweet and Bitter News, Nûbûn, 102.
- 2008 From Classicism to Futurism: Reşîdê Kurd, Nûbûn, 104.
- 2008 Black Wound, Nûbûn, 105.
- 2008 Fate, Nûbûn, 106.
- 2008 It's Autumn Now from the Meadows!, Nûbûn, 107.

== Other works ==
- 1999 I Hid My Flock in a Valley, Avesta Publications, poetry.
- 2002 These Mountains Are Not Naked, Avesta Publications, poetry.
- 2003 The Epic of Kawa, Elma Publications, poetry.
- 2006 Erotica, Lîs Publications, poetry.
- 2008 North of Poetry / Anthology of Northern Poetry, Publications of the Union of Kurdish Writers-Duhok, anthology.
- 2008 Şêrgele, Avesta Publications, poetry.
- 2009 Forty Çarîn, Publications of the Kurdish Institute of Diyarbakır, poetry.
- 2010 The Swallow Behind the Border, Avesta, short stories.
- 2011 Autumn of Words, Belkî Publications, Diyarbakır, poetry.
- 2011 The Epic of Kawa and Azhî Dehaq (Turkish translation: Şener Özmen), Evrensel Basım Yayın Publications, Istanbul, epic.
- 2012 Flowers of Oblivion, Ronahî Publications, Diyarbakır, poetry.
- 2012 Grave and Oppressed, Ronahî Publications, Diyarbakır, poetry.
- 2012 Xasenezer, Evrensel Basım Yayın Publications, Istanbul, essays.
- 2013 Poetry and Border, Evrensel Basım Yayın Publications, Istanbul, poetry.
- 2013 The Pen Enchanted the Alert Paper, Ronahî Publications, Diyarbakır, essays.

== Bibliography ==
- W Magazine, 32 (2010). Dossier: Arjen Arî.
