= Gürün, Nusaybin =

Village in Mardin Province, Turkey

Gürün
- Neighbourhood
- Location in Turkey
- Coordinates: 37.130°N 41.244°E
- Country: Turkey
- Province: Mardin
- District: Nusaybin
- Population (2021): 159
- Time zone: UTC+3 (TRT)

Gürün (Kurdish: Gurînê) is a neighbourhood in the municipality and district of Nusaybin, Mardin Province in Turkey. The village is populated by Kurds of the Koçekan tribe and had a population of 159 in 2021.
