= Yandere, Nusaybin =

Village in Mardin Province, Turkey

Yandere
- Neighbourhood
- Location in Turkey
- Coordinates: 37.182°N 41.075°E
- Country: Turkey
- Province: Mardin
- District: Nusaybin
- Population (2021): 408
- Time zone: UTC+3 (TRT)

Yandere (Kurdish: Hatxê) is a neighbourhood in the municipality and district of Nusaybin, Mardin Province in Turkey. The village is populated by Kurds of the Bubilan tribe and had a population of 408 in 2021.
