= Beylik, Nusaybin =

Village in Mardin Province, Turkey

Beylik
- Neighbourhood
- Location in Turkey
- Coordinates: 37.105°N 41.261°E
- Country: Turkey
- Province: Mardin
- District: Nusaybin
- Population (2021): 112
- Time zone: UTC+3 (TRT)

Beylik (Kurdish: Bakisyan) is a neighbourhood in the municipality and district of Nusaybin, Mardin Province in Turkey. The village is populated by Kurds of the Barava and Mizizex tribes and had a population of 112 in 2021.
