= Çatalözü, Nusaybin =

Village in Mardin Province, Turkey

Çatalözü
- Neighbourhood
- Mardin Province
- Location within Turkey
- Coordinates: 37.097°N 41.214°E
- Country: Turkey
- Province: Mardin
- District: Nusaybin
- Population (2021): 2,289
- Time zone: UTC+3 (TRT)

Çatalözü (Kurdish: Gundikê Xêlid) is a neighbourhood in the municipality and district of Nusaybin, Mardin Province in Turkey. The village is populated by Kurds of the Koçekan tribe and had a population of 2,289 in 2021.
