= Yolbilen, Nusaybin =

Village in Mardin Province, Turkey

Yolbilen
- Neighbourhood
- Location in Turkey
- Coordinates: 37.091°N 41.338°E
- Country: Turkey
- Province: Mardin
- District: Nusaybin
- Population (2021): 578
- Time zone: UTC+3 (TRT)

Yolbilen (Kurdish: Erbet) is a neighbourhood in the municipality and district of Nusaybin, Mardin Province in Turkey. The village is populated by Kurds of the Çomeran tribe and had a population of 578 in 2021.
