= Çalıköy, Nusaybin =

Village in Mardin Province, Turkey

Çalıköy
- Neighbourhood
- Location in Turkey
- Coordinates: 37.285°N 41.129°E
- Country: Turkey
- Province: Mardin
- District: Nusaybin
- Population (2021): 105
- Time zone: UTC+3 (TRT)

Çalıköy (Kurdish: Çalê) is a neighbourhood in the municipality and district of Nusaybin, Mardin Province in Turkey. The village is populated by Kurds of the Omerkan tribe and had a population of 105 in 2021.

== Notable people ==
- Arjen Arî
