= İkiztepe, Nusaybin =

Village in Mardin Province, Turkey

İkiztepe
- Neighbourhood
- Location in Turkey
- Coordinates: 37.100°N 41.572°E
- Country: Turkey
- Province: Mardin
- District: Nusaybin
- Population (2021): 347
- Time zone: UTC+3 (TRT)

İkiztepe (Kurdish: Têzxerab; Syriac: Tizharab) (Note: Alternatively transliterated as Tezharap, Tīz Ḫrāb, and Tiz-Harab.) is a village in the municipality and district of Nusaybin, Mardin Province in Turkey. The village is populated by Kurds of the Bêcirmanî tribe and had a population of 347 in 2021.

== History ==
Tizharab (today called İkiztepe) was historically inhabited by Syriac Orthodox Christians. In the Syriac Orthodox patriarchal register of dues of 1870, it was recorded that the village had ten households, who paid sixty-three dues, and it did not have a church or a priest. The village was inhabited by 300 Syriacs in 1914, according to the Assyro-Chaldean delegation to the Paris Peace Conference.

== Bibliography ==
- Bcheiry, Iskandar (2009). The Syriac Orthodox Patriarchal Register of Dues of 1870: An Unpublished Historical Document from the Late Ottoman Period. Gorgias Press.
- Gaunt, David (2006). Massacres, Resistance, Protectors: Muslim-Christian Relations in Eastern Anatolia during World War I. Gorgias Press.
- Jongerden, Joost; Verheij, Jelle, eds. (2012). Social Relations in Ottoman Diyarbekir, 1870-1915. Brill.
- Tan, Altan (2018). Turabidin'den Berriye'ye. Aşiretler - Dinler - Diller - Kültürler (in Turkish). Pak Ajans Yayincilik Turizm Ve Diş Ticaret Limited şirketi. p. 371. ISBN 9789944360944.
