= Durakbaşı, Nusaybin =

Village in Mardin Province, Turkey

Durakbaşı
- Neighbourhood
- Location in Turkey
- Coordinates: 37.106°N 41.073°E
- Country: Turkey
- Province: Mardin
- District: Nusaybin
- Population (2021): 376
- Time zone: UTC+3 (TRT)

Durakbaşı (Kurdish: Qesra) is a neighbourhood in the municipality and district of Nusaybin, Mardin Province in Turkey. The village is populated by Kurds of the Bubilan tribe and had a population of 376 in 2021.
