= Acıkköy, Nusaybin =

Village in Mardin Province, Turkey

Acıkköy
- Neighbourhood
- Location in Turkey
- Coordinates: 37.166°N 41.134°E
- Country: Turkey
- Province: Mardin
- District: Nusaybin
- Population (2021): 331
- Time zone: UTC+3 (TRT)

Acıkköy (Kurdish: Bamidê) is a neighbourhood in the municipality and district of Nusaybin, Mardin Province in Turkey. The village is populated by Kurds of the Koçekan tribe and had a population of 331 in 2021.
