= Ocaklı, Nusaybin =

Village in Mardin Province, Turkey

Ocaklı
- Settlement
- Location in Turkey
- Coordinates: 37.11378°N 41.54377°E
- Country: Turkey
- Province: Mardin
- District: Nusaybin
- Time zone: UTC+3 (TRT)

Ocaklı (Syriac: Bīr ‘Alīkī) (Note: Also known as Pirali or Peroulé.) is a settlement in the municipality and district of Nusaybin, Mardin Province in Turkey.

== History ==
Bīr ‘Alīkī (today called Ocaklı) was historically inhabited by Syriac Orthodox Christians. In the Syriac Orthodox patriarchal register of dues of 1870, it was recorded that the village had 1 household, who paid 5 dues, and did not have a church or a priest. It was located in the Nusaybin kaza in the Mardin sanjak in the Diyarbekir vilayet in c. 1900. It was populated by 100 Syriacs in 1914, according to the list presented to the Paris Peace Conference by the Assyro-Chaldean delegation.

== Bibliography ==
- Bcheiry, Iskandar (2009). The Syriac Orthodox Patriarchal Register of Dues of 1870: An Unpublished Historical Document from the Late Ottoman Period. Gorgias Press.
- Gaunt, David (2006). Massacres, Resistance, Protectors: Muslim-Christian Relations in Eastern Anatolia during World War I. Gorgias Press.
- Jongerden, Joost; Verheij, Jelle, eds. (2012). Social Relations in Ottoman Diyarbekir, 1870-1915. Brill.
