= Açıkyol, Nusaybin =

Village in Mardin Province, Turkey

Açıkyol
- Neighbourhood
- Location in Turkey
- Coordinates: 37.177°N 41.182°E
- Country: Turkey
- Province: Mardin
- District: Nusaybin
- Population (2021): 75
- Time zone: UTC+3 (TRT)

Açıkyol (Kurdish: Aferî) is a neighbourhood in the municipality and district of Nusaybin, Mardin Province in Turkey. The village is populated by Kurds of the Koçekan tribe and had a population of 75 in 2021.
