= Akağıl, Nusaybin =

Village in Mardin Province, Turkey

Akağıl
- Neighbourhood
- Location in Turkey
- Coordinates: 37.127°N 41.161°E
- Country: Turkey
- Province: Mardin
- District: Nusaybin
- Population (2021): 195
- Time zone: UTC+3 (TRT)

Akağıl (Kurdish: Derzandik) is a neighbourhood in the municipality and district of Nusaybin, Mardin Province in Turkey. Populated by Kurds of non-tribal affiliation, it had a population of 195 in 2021.
