= Küçükkardeş, Nusaybin =

Village in Mardin Province, Turkey

Küçükkardeş
- Neighbourhood
- Location in Turkey
- Coordinates: 37.276°N 41.028°E
- Country: Turkey
- Province: Mardin
- District: Nusaybin
- Population (2021): 175
- Time zone: UTC+3 (TRT)

Küçükkardeş (Kurdish: Cinata Hiso) is a neighbourhood in the municipality and district of Nusaybin, Mardin Province in Turkey. The village is populated by Kurds of the Omerkan tribe and had a population of 175 in 2021.
