= Heybeli, Nusaybin =

Village in Mardin Province, Turkey

Heybeli
- Neighbourhood
- Location in Turkey
- Coordinates: 37.320°N 41.031°E
- Country: Turkey
- Province: Mardin
- District: Nusaybin
- Population (2021): 78
- Time zone: UTC+3 (TRT)

Heybeli (Kurdish: Dêrcemê) is a neighbourhood in the municipality and district of Nusaybin, Mardin Province in Turkey. The village is populated by Kurds of the Omerkan tribe and had a population of 78 in 2021.
