= Çiğdem, Nusaybin =

Village in Mardin Province, Turkey

Çiğdem
- Neighbourhood
- Location in Turkey
- Coordinates: 37°06′11″N 41°29′46″E
- Country: Turkey
- Province: Mardin
- District: Nusaybin
- Population (2021): 164
- Time zone: UTC+3 (TRT)

Çiğdem (Kurdish: Giremara, lit. 'snake hill'; Syriac: Girēmarā) (Note: Alternatively spelt as Germayrek, Girimara, or Keremaré.) is a neighbourhood in the municipality and district of Nusaybin, Mardin Province in Turkey. The village is populated by Kurds of the Mizizex tribe and had a population of 164 in 2021.

== History ==
Girēmarā (today called Çiğdem) was historically inhabited by Syriac Orthodox Christians. In the Syriac Orthodox patriarchal register of dues of 1870, it was recorded that the village had twenty-five households, who paid eighty-seven dues, and it did not have a church or a priest. In 1914, there were 250 Syriacs, according to the list presented to the Paris Peace Conference by the Assyro-Chaldean delegation. It was populated by 26 Turoyo-speaking Christians in five families in 1966.

== Bibliography ==
- Bcheiry, Iskandar (2009). The Syriac Orthodox Patriarchal Register of Dues of 1870: An Unpublished Historical Document from the Late Ottoman Period. Gorgias Press.
- Gaunt, David (2006). Massacres, Resistance, Protectors: Muslim-Christian Relations in Eastern Anatolia during World War I. Gorgias Press.
- Jongerden, Joost; Verheij, Jelle, eds. (2012). Social Relations in Ottoman Diyarbekir, 1870-1915. Brill.
- Ritter, Hellmut (1967). Turoyo: Die Volkssprache der Syrischen Christen des Tur 'Abdin (in German). Vol. 1. Franz Steiner Verlag.
- Tan, Altan (2018). Turabidin'den Berriye'ye. Aşiretler - Dinler - Diller - Kültürler (in Turkish). Pak Ajans Yayincilik Turizm Ve Diş Ticaret Limited şirketi. ISBN 9789944360944.
