= Sınırtepe, Nusaybin =

Village in Mardin Province, Turkey

Sınırtepe
- Neighbourhood
- Location in Turkey
- Coordinates: 37.081°N 41.512°E
- Country: Turkey
- Province: Mardin
- District: Nusaybin
- Population (2021): 192
- Time zone: UTC+3 (TRT)

Sınırtepe (Kurdish: Aznavur; Syriac: Aznāwūr) (Note: Alternatively transliterated as Aznavr or Haznaour.) is a neighbourhood in the municipality and district of Nusaybin, Mardin Province in Turkey. The village is populated by Kurds of the Kasikan tribe and had a population of 192 in 2021.

== History ==
Aznāwūr (today called Sınırtepe) was historically inhabited by Syriac Orthodox Christians. The name of the village was derived from the Circassians who were settled there. It was visited in 1840 by Reverend Horatio Southgate, who noted the village served as the residence of the local chief and that there were 40 families, consisting of Syriac Orthodox Christians and Muslim Kurds. In the Syriac Orthodox patriarchal register of dues of 1870, it was recorded that the village had 26 households, who paid 95 dues, and did not have a church or a priest. By 1880, the village was wholly inhabited by Syriac Orthodox Christians. In 1914, there were 350 Syriacs, according to the list presented to the Paris Peace Conference by the Assyro-Chaldean delegation.

== Bibliography ==
- Bcheiry, Iskandar (2009). The Syriac Orthodox Patriarchal Register of Dues of 1870: An Unpublished Historical Document from the Late Ottoman Period. Gorgias Press.
- Bcheiry, Iskandar (2019). "Digitizing and Schematizing the Archival Material from the Late Ottoman Period Found in the Monastery of al-Zaʿfarān in Southeast Turkey". Atla Summary of Proceedings. 72 (January): 50–61. doi:10.31046/proceedings.2018.113.
- Courtois, Sébastien de (2004). The Forgotten Genocide: Eastern Christians, The Last Arameans. Translated by Vincent Aurora. Gorgias Press.
- Gaunt, David (2006). Massacres, Resistance, Protectors: Muslim-Christian Relations in Eastern Anatolia during World War I. Gorgias Press.
- Jongerden, Joost; Verheij, Jelle, eds. (2012). Social Relations in Ottoman Diyarbekir, 1870-1915. Brill.
- Southgate, Horatio (1840). Narrative of a tour through Armenia, Kurdistan, Persia and Mesopotamia: With an introduction, and occasional observations upon the condition of Mohammedanism and Christianity in those countries. Vol. II.
- Tan, Altan (2018). Turabidin'den Berriye'ye. Aşiretler - Dinler - Diller - Kültürler (in Turkish). Pak Ajans Yayincilik Turizm Ve Diş Ticaret Limited şirketi. ISBN 9789944360944.
