= Söğütlü, Nusaybin =

Village in Mardin Province, Turkey

Söğütlü
- Neighbourhood
- Location in Turkey
- Coordinates: 37.122°N 41.568°E
- Country: Turkey
- Province: Mardin
- District: Nusaybin
- Population (2021): 332
- Time zone: UTC+3 (TRT)

Söğütlü (Kurdish: Girêbiya; Syriac: Grebya) (Note: Alternatively transliterated as Ǧarībiyyā, Girebya, Giribiya, Grebiyeh, or Kerpia.) is a neighbourhood in the municipality and district of Nusaybin, Mardin Province in Turkey. The village is populated by Kurds and had a population of 332 in 2021.

== History ==
Grebya (today called Söğütlü) was historically inhabited by Syriac Orthodox Christians. In the Syriac Orthodox patriarchal register of dues of 1870, it was recorded that the village had 12 households, who paid 63 dues, and did not have a church or a priest. In 1914, it was populated by 300 Syriacs, according to the list presented to the Paris Peace Conference by the Assyro-Chaldean delegation. There were 10 Syriac families in 1915. Amidst the Sayfo, the Syriacs were escorted to safety at Hebob by Agha Hassan of Grebya. The village had around 30 Turoyo-speaking Christian families in 1968. Kurdish was also spoken by some in the village. By 1987, there were no remaining Syriacs.

== Bibliography ==
- Andrews, Peter Alford; Benninghaus, Rüdiger, eds. (1989). Ethnic Groups in the Republic of Turkey.
- Bcheiry, Iskandar (2009). The Syriac Orthodox Patriarchal Register of Dues of 1870: An Unpublished Historical Document from the Late Ottoman Period. Gorgias Press.
- Courtois, Sébastien de (2004). The Forgotten Genocide: Eastern Christians, The Last Arameans. Translated by Vincent Aurora. Gorgias Press.
- Gaunt, David (2006). Massacres, Resistance, Protectors: Muslim-Christian Relations in Eastern Anatolia during World War I. Gorgias Press.
- Jongerden, Joost; Verheij, Jelle, eds. (2012). Social Relations in Ottoman Diyarbekir, 1870-1915. Brill.
- Tan, Altan (2018). Turabidin'den Berriye'ye. Aşiretler - Dinler - Diller - Kültürler (in Turkish). Pak Ajans Yayincilik Turizm Ve Diş Ticaret Limited şirketi. ISBN 9789944360944.
