= Hasantepe, Nusaybin =

Village in Mardin Province, Turkey

Hasantepe
- Neighbourhood
- Location in Turkey
- Coordinates: 37.127°N 41.494°E
- Country: Turkey
- Province: Mardin
- District: Nusaybin
- Population (2021): 241
- Time zone: UTC+3 (TRT)

Hasantepe (Kurdish: Tilhasan; Syriac: Tal-Ḥasan) (Note: Alternatively transliterated as Tel-Hasan, Telhasan or Tel Hasan.) is a neighbourhood in the municipality and district of Nusaybin, Mardin Province in Turkey. The village is populated by Kurds of the Mizizex tribe and had a population of 241 in 2021.

== History ==
Tal-Ḥasan (today called Hasantepe) was historically inhabited by Syriac Orthodox Christians. In the Syriac Orthodox patriarchal register of dues of 1870, it was recorded that the village had seven households, who paid twenty-five dues, and it did not have a church or a priest. There were fifteen Syriac families in 1915. Amidst the Sayfo, the village's owner Ömer Osman had the Syriacs killed and personally murdered seven Syriac widows and collected their blood. By 1987, there were no remaining Syriacs.

== Bibliography ==
- Bcheiry, Iskandar (2009). The Syriac Orthodox Patriarchal Register of Dues of 1870: An Unpublished Historical Document from the Late Ottoman Period. Gorgias Press.
- Courtois, Sébastien de (2004). The Forgotten Genocide: Eastern Christians, The Last Arameans. Translated by Vincent Aurora. Gorgias Press.
- Gaunt, David (2006). Massacres, Resistance, Protectors: Muslim-Christian Relations in Eastern Anatolia during World War I. Gorgias Press.
- Jongerden, Joost; Verheij, Jelle, eds. (2012). Social Relations in Ottoman Diyarbekir, 1870-1915. Brill.
- Tan, Altan (2018). Turabidin'den Berriye'ye. Aşiretler - Dinler - Diller - Kültürler (in Turkish). Pak Ajans Yayincilik Turizm Ve Diş Ticaret Limited şirketi. ISBN 9789944360944.
