= Girmeli, Nusaybin =

Village in Mardin Province, Turkey

Girmeli
- Neighbourhood
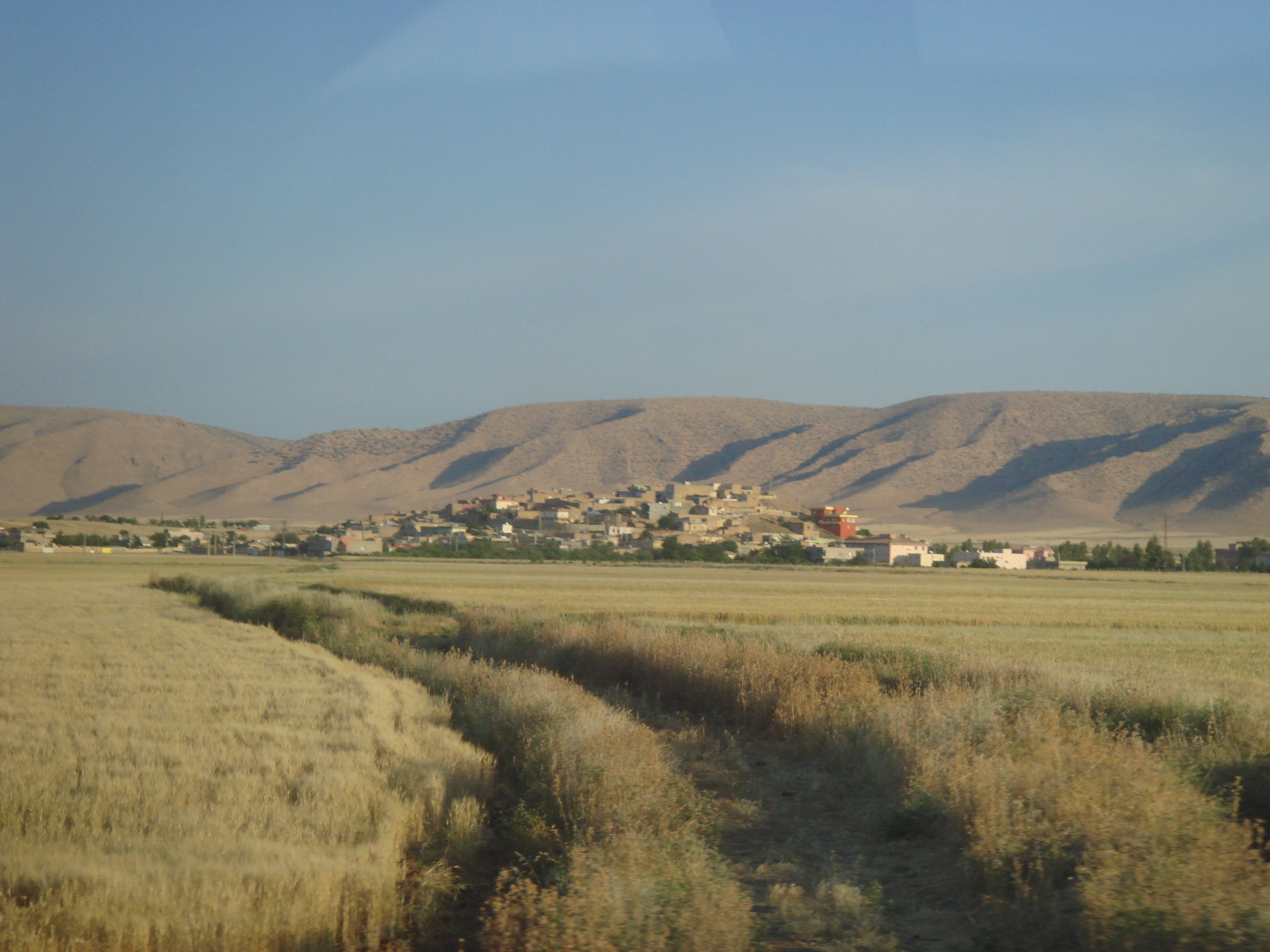

- Location within Turkey
- Coordinates: 37.113°N 41.428°E
- Country: Turkey
- Province: Mardin
- District: Nusaybin
- Population (2022): 3,247
- Time zone: UTC+3 (TRT)

Girmeli (Kurdish: Girê Mîra, lit. 'Emir hill'; (Note: Also spelt as Girêbiya.) Syriac: Gırēmīrā) (Note: Alternatively transliterated as Girmira, Giremira, Girimira, Gremira, Gremirah, Grīmīrah, or Krémira.) is a neighbourhood of the municipality and district of Nusaybin, Mardin Province, Turkey. The population was 3,247 in 2022. Before the 2013 reorganisation, it was a town (belde). The village is populated by Syriacs and by Kurds of the Mizizex and Omerkan tribes.

== History ==
In the Syriac Orthodox patriarchal register of dues of 1870, it was recorded that Gırēmīrā (today called Girmeli) had 8 households, who paid 48 dues, and it did not have a church or a priest. It was inhabited by 400 Syriacs in 1914, according to the list presented to the Paris Peace Conference by the Assyro-Chaldean delegation. In 1915, there were 70 Syriac families and 10 Kurdish families. The Syriacs adhered to the Syriac Orthodox Church. Amidst the Sayfo, the Syriacs took refuge elsewhere. The village had a population of 571 in 1960. There were 225 Turoyo-speaking Christians in 34 families in 1966. By 1987, there were 7 Syriac families.

== Demography ==
The following is a list of the number of Syriac families that have inhabited Gırēmīrā per year stated. Unless otherwise stated, all figures are from the list provided in The Syrian Orthodox Christians in the Late Ottoman Period and Beyond: Crisis then Revival, as noted in the bibliography below.

- 1915: 70
- 1966: 34
- 1978: 32
- 1979: 29
- 1981: 25
- 1987: 7

== Bibliography ==
- Aydın, Suavi (2000). Mardin: aşiret, cemaat, devlet. Türkiye Ekonomik ve Toplumsal Tarih Vakfı. ISBN 9757306673.
- Bcheiry, Iskandar (2009). The Syriac Orthodox Patriarchal Register of Dues of 1870: An Unpublished Historical Document from the Late Ottoman Period. Gorgias Press.
- Biner, Zerrin Özlem (2020). States of Dispossession: Violence and Precarious Coexistence in Southeast Turkey. University of Pennsylvania Press.
- Courtois, Sébastien de (2004). The Forgotten Genocide: Eastern Christians, The Last Arameans. Translated by Vincent Aurora. Gorgias Press.
- Dinno, Khalid S. (2017). The Syrian Orthodox Christians in the Late Ottoman Period and Beyond: Crisis then Revival. Gorgias Press.
- Gaunt, David (2006). Massacres, Resistance, Protectors: Muslim-Christian Relations in Eastern Anatolia during World War I. Gorgias Press.
- Jongerden, Joost; Verheij, Jelle, eds. (2012). Social Relations in Ottoman Diyarbekir, 1870-1915. Brill.
- Ritter, Hellmut (1967). Turoyo: Die Volkssprache der Syrischen Christen des Tur 'Abdin (in German). Vol. 1. Franz Steiner Verlag.
- Tan, Altan (2018). Turabidin'den Berriye'ye. Aşiretler - Dinler - Diller - Kültürler (in Turkish). Pak Ajans Yayincilik Turizm Ve Diş Ticaret Limited şirketi. ISBN 9789944360944.
