= Bakacık, Nusaybin =

Village in Mardin Province, Turkey

Bakacık
- Neighbourhood
- Location within Turkey
- Coordinates: 37.144°N 41.600°E
- Country: Turkey
- Province: Mardin
- District: Nusaybin
- Population (2021): 85
- Time zone: UTC+3 (TRT)

Bakacık (Kurdish: Kinikê; Syriac: Kanḫah) (Note: Alternatively transliterated as Kanik, Kinnik, or Knaneké.) is a neighbourhood in the municipality and district of Nusaybin, Mardin Province in Turkey. The village is populated by Kurds of the Dasikan tribe and had a population of 85 in 2021.

== History ==
Kanḫah (today called Bakacık) was historically inhabited by Syriac Orthodox Christians. The Mor Gabriel Monastery historically owned property in the village. In the Syriac Orthodox patriarchal register of dues of 1870, it was recorded that the village had forty-five households, who paid two hundred and fifty-five dues, and the village was served by the Church of Yūldaṯ Alohō and one priest. In 1914, it was inhabited by 100 Syriacs, according to the list presented to the Paris Peace Conference by the Assyro-Chaldean delegation.

== Bibliography ==
- Bcheiry, Iskandar (2009). The Syriac Orthodox Patriarchal Register of Dues of 1870: An Unpublished Historical Document from the Late Ottoman Period. Gorgias Press.
- Bilge, Yakup (2012). "The Saint Gabriel Monastery Trust". In Pieter Omtzigt; Markus K. Tozman; Andrea Tyndall (eds.). The Slow Disappearance of the Syriacs from Turkey and of the Grounds of the Mor Gabriel Monastery (PDF). LIT Verlag Münster. pp. 209–218.
- Gaunt, David (2006). Massacres, Resistance, Protectors: Muslim-Christian Relations in Eastern Anatolia during World War I. Gorgias Press.
- Jongerden, Joost; Verheij, Jelle, eds. (2012). Social Relations in Ottoman Diyarbekir, 1870-1915. Brill.
- Tan, Altan (2018). Turabidin'den Berriye'ye. Aşiretler - Dinler - Diller - Kültürler (in Turkish). Pak Ajans Yayincilik Turizm Ve Diş Ticaret Limited şirketi. ISBN 9789944360944.
