= Büyükkardeş, Nusaybin =

Village in Mardin Province, Turkey

Büyükkardeş
- Neighbourhood
- Location in Turkey
- Coordinates: 37.272°N 41.033°E
- Country: Turkey
- Province: Mardin
- District: Nusaybin
- Population (2021): 541
- Time zone: UTC+3 (TRT)

Büyükkardeş (Kurdish: Cinata Miho) is a neighbourhood in the municipality and district of Nusaybin, Mardin Province in Turkey. The village is populated by Kurds of the Omerkan tribe and had a population of 541 in 2021.
