= Turgutköy, Nusaybin =

Village in Mardin Province, Turkey

Turgutköy
- Neighbourhood
- Location in Turkey
- Coordinates: 37.145°N 41.653°E
- Country: Turkey
- Province: Mardin
- District: Nusaybin
- Population (2021): 128
- Time zone: UTC+3 (TRT)

Turgutköy (Kurdish: Kemina) is a neighbourhood in the municipality and district of Nusaybin, Mardin Province in Turkey. The village had a population of 128 in 2021.
