= Dirim, Nusaybin =

Village in Mardin Province, Turkey

Dirim
- Neighbourhood
- Location in Turkey
- Coordinates: 37.207°N 41.136°E
- Country: Turkey
- Province: Mardin
- District: Nusaybin
- Population (2021): 49
- Time zone: UTC+3 (TRT)

Dirim (Kurdish: Şabanê) is a neighbourhood in the municipality and district of Nusaybin, Mardin Province in Turkey. The village is populated by Kurds of the Koçekan tribe and had a population of 49 in 2021.
