= Nergizli, Nusaybin =

Village in Mardin Province, Turkey

Nergizli
- Neighbourhood
- Location in Turkey
- Coordinates: 37.082°N 41.355°E
- Country: Turkey
- Province: Mardin
- District: Nusaybin
- Population (2021): 21
- Time zone: UTC+3 (TRT)

Nergizli (Kurdish: Nergizlokê) is a neighbourhood in the municipality and district of Nusaybin, Mardin Province in Turkey. The village is populated by Kurds of the Mizizex tribe and had a population of 21 in 2021.
