= Güvenli, Nusaybin =

Village in Mardin Province, Turkey

Güvenli
- Neighbourhood
- Location in Turkey
- Coordinates: 37.308°N 41.044°E
- Country: Turkey
- Province: Mardin
- District: Nusaybin
- Population (2021): 71
- Time zone: UTC+3 (TRT)

Güvenli (Kurdish: Xirbeka) is a neighbourhood in the municipality and district of Nusaybin, Mardin Province in Turkey. The village is populated by Kurds of the Omerkan tribe and had a population of 71 in 2021.
