= Tepealtı, Nusaybin =

Village in Mardin Province, Turkey

Tepealtı
- Neighbourhood
- Location in Turkey
- Coordinates: 37.096°N 41.371°E
- Country: Turkey
- Province: Mardin
- District: Nusaybin
- Population (2021): 699
- Time zone: UTC+3 (TRT)

Tepealtı (Kurdish: Tel Yaqub; Syriac: Tel-Ya’qub) (Note: Alternatively transliterated as Tal Ya'qūb, Tel-Yacoub, Telyakup, or Tilyakup.) is a neighbourhood in the municipality and district of Nusaybin, Mardin Province in Turkey. The village is populated by Kurds of the Kasikan tribe and had a population of 699 in 2021. It is located on the slopes of Mount Izla.

== History ==
Tel-Ya’qub (today called Tepealtı) was historically inhabited by Syriac Orthodox Christians. In the Syriac Orthodox patriarchal register of dues of 1870, it was recorded that the village had nine households, who paid fifteen dues, and it did not have a church or a priest. It was populated by 300 Syriacs in 1914, as per the list presented to the Paris Peace Conference by the Assyro-Chaldean delegation. There were ten Syriac families in 1915. Amidst the Sayfo, the Syriacs took refuge at Mharkan, where they were then killed. By 1987, there were no remaining Syriacs.

== Bibliography ==
- Bcheiry, Iskandar (2009). The Syriac Orthodox Patriarchal Register of Dues of 1870: An Unpublished Historical Document from the Late Ottoman Period. Gorgias Press.
- Courtois, Sébastien de (2004). The Forgotten Genocide: Eastern Christians, The Last Arameans. Translated by Vincent Aurora. Gorgias Press.
- Gaunt, David (2006). Massacres, Resistance, Protectors: Muslim-Christian Relations in Eastern Anatolia during World War I. Gorgias Press.
- Jongerden, Joost; Verheij, Jelle, eds. (2012). Social Relations in Ottoman Diyarbekir, 1870-1915. Brill.
- Tan, Altan (2018). Turabidin'den Berriye'ye. Aşiretler - Dinler - Diller - Kültürler (in Turkish). Pak Ajans Yayincilik Turizm Ve Diş Ticaret Limited şirketi. ISBN 9789944360944.
