= List of populated places in Mardin Province =

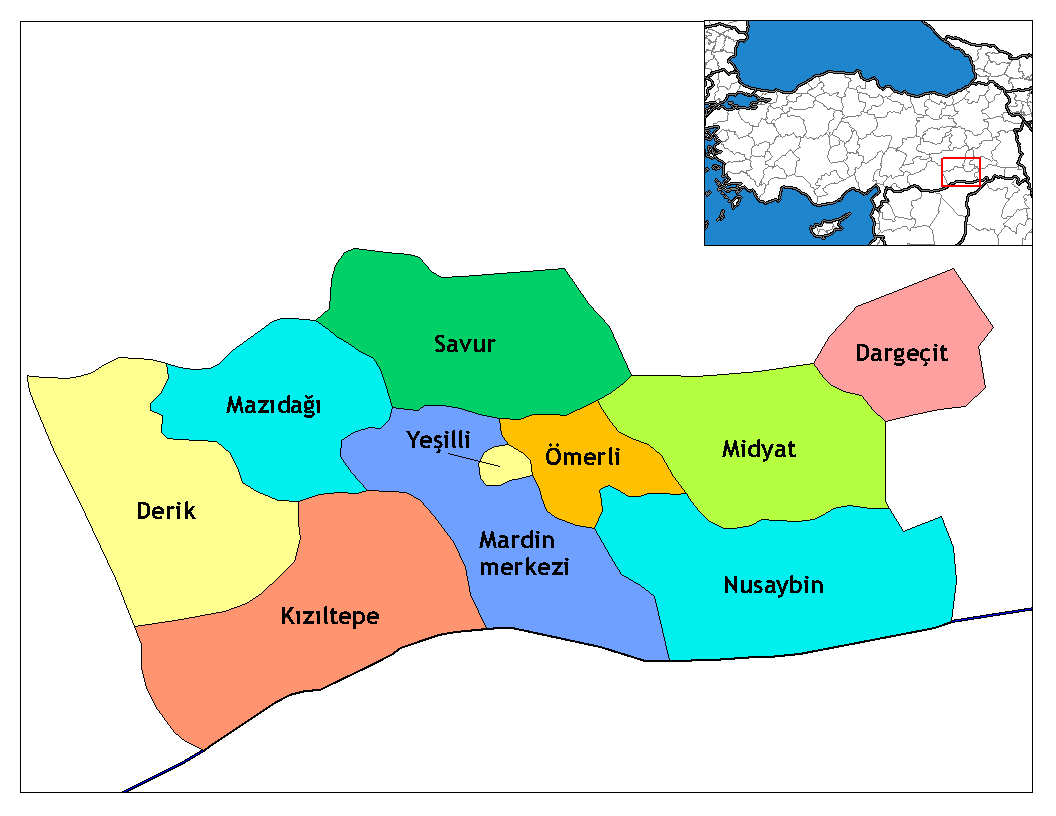
Mardin Province

Below is the list of populated places in Mardin Province, Turkey by the districts. In the following lists first place in each list is the administrative center of the district.

== Mardin ==
- Mardin
- Acar, Mardin
- Ahmetli, Mardin
- Akbağ, Mardin
- Akıncı, Mardin
- Alakuş, Mardin
- Alımlı, Mardin
- Ambar, Mardin
- Aran, Mardin
- Arpatepe, Mardin
- Aşağıyeniköy, Mardin
- Avcılar, Mardin
- Aytepe, Mardin
- Bağlıca, Mardin
- Boztepe, Mardin
- Buğday, Mardin
- Cevizlik, Mardin
- Cevizpınarı, Mardin
- Çağlar, Mardin
- Çalışlı, Mardin
- Çatak, Mardin
- Çayırpınar, Mardin
- Çıplaktepe, Mardin
- Çiftlikköy, Mardin
- Çukuryurt, Mardin
- Dara, Mardin
- Dibektaş, Mardin
- Düzlük, Mardin
- Elmabahçe, Mardin
- Eroğlu, Mardin
- Eryeri, Mardin
- Esentepe, Mardin
- Eskikale, Mardin
- Göllü, Mardin
- Güneyli, Mardin
- Gürağaç, Mardin
- Hatunlu, Mardin
- Haydar, Mardin
- Hüyüklü, Mardin
- Kabala, Mardin
- Karademir, Mardin
- Konaklı, Mardin
- Kumlu, Mardin
- Kuyulu, Mardin
- Küçükköy, Mardin
- Nur, Mardin
- Ortaköy, Mardin
- Sakalar, Mardin
- Sulak, Mardin
- Sultanköy, Mardin
- Tandır, Mardin
- Tilkitepe, Mardin
- Tozan, Mardin
- Yalım, Mardin
- Yardere, Mardin
- Yayla, Mardin
- Yaylabaşı, Mardin
- Yaylacık, Mardin
- Yaylı, Mardin
- Yenice, Mardin
- Yeniköy, Mardin
- Yolbaşı, Mardin
- Yukarıaydınlı, Mardin
- Yukarıhatunlu, Mardin
- Yukarıyeniköy, Mardin

== Dargeçit ==
- Dargeçit
- Akçaköy, Dargeçit
- Akyol, Dargeçit
- Alayunt, Dargeçit
- Altınoluk, Dargeçit
- Altıyol, Dargeçit
- Bağözü, Dargeçit
- Batur, Dargeçit
- Baysun, Dargeçit
- Beğendi, Dargeçit
- Belen, Dargeçit
- Bostanlı, Dargeçit
- Çatalan, Dargeçit
- Çatalçam, Dargeçit
- Çelikköy, Dargeçit
- Çukurdere, Dargeçit
- Değerli, Dargeçit
- Gürgen, Dargeçit
- Gürışık, Dargeçit
- Ilısu, Dargeçit
- Karabayır, Dargeçit
- Kartalkaya, Dargeçit
- Kılavuz, Dargeçit
- Kısmetli, Dargeçit
- Korucu, Dargeçit
- Suçatı, Dargeçit
- Sümer, Dargeçit
- Tanyeri, Dargeçit
- Tavşanlı, Dargeçit
- Temelli, Dargeçit
- Yanılmaz, Dargeçit
- Yılmaz, Dargeçit
- Yoncalı, Dargeçit

== Derik ==
- Derik
- Adak, Derik
- Adakent, Derik
- Ahmetli, Derik
- Akçay, Derik
- Akıncılar, Derik
- Alagöz, Derik
- Alanlı, Derik
- Alibey, Derik
- Ambarlı, Derik
- Aşağımezra, Derik
- Atlı, Derik
- Aydınlar, Derik
- Ballı, Derik
- Balova, Derik
- Başaran, Derik
- Bayırköy, Derik
- Bayraklı, Derik
- Beşbudak, Derik
- Boyaklı, Derik
- Bozbayır, Derik
- Bozok, Derik
- Böğrek, Derik
- Burçköy, Derik
- Çadırlı, Derik
- Çağıl, Derik
- Çataltepe, Derik
- Çayköy, Derik
- Çukursu, Derik
- Demirli, Derik
- Denktaş, Derik
- Derinsu, Derik
- Dikmen, Derik
- Doğancı, Derik
- Dumanlı, Derik
- Dumluca, Derik
- Düztaş, Derik
- Göktaş, Derik
- Gölbaşı, Derik
- Hisaraltı, Derik
- Ilıca, Derik
- Issız, Derik
- İncesu, Derik
- Kanatlı, Derik
- Karaburun, Derik
- Karataş, Derik
- Kayacık, Derik
- Kocatepe, Derik
- Koçyiğit, Derik
- Konak, Derik
- Konuk, Derik
- Kovalı, Derik
- Kovanlı, Derik
- Köseveli, Derik
- Kuruçay, Derik
- Kuşçu, Derik
- Kutluca, Derik
- Kuyulu, Derik
- Meşeli, Derik
- Ortaca, Derik
- Pınarcık, Derik
- Pirinçli, Derik
- Soğukkuyu, Derik
- Subaşı, Derik
- Şahverdi, Derik
- Şerefli, Derik
- Taşıt, Derik
- Üçkuyu, Derik
- Üçtepe, Derik
- Yazıcık, Derik
- Yukarımezra, Derik

== Kızıltepe ==
- Kızıltepe
- Akalın, Kızıltepe
- Akça, Kızıltepe
- Akçapınar, Kızıltepe
- Akdoğan. Kızıltepe
- Akkoç, Kızıltepe
- Aktepe, Kızıltepe
- Aktulga, Kızıltepe
- Akyazı, Kızıltepe
- Akyüz, Kızıltepe
- Akziyaret, Kızıltepe
- Alakuş, Kızıltepe
- Alemdar. Kızıltepe
- Alipaşa, Kızıltepe
- Altıntoprak, Kızıltepe
- Arakapı, Kızıltepe
- Araköy, Kızıltepe
- Arıklı, Kızıltepe
- Arıtepe, Kızıltepe
- Aslanlı, Kızıltepe
- Aşağıazıklı, Kızıltepe
- Ataköy, Kızıltepe
- Atmaca, Kızıltepe
- Ayaz, Kızıltepe
- Bağrıbütün, Kızıltepe
- Barış, Kızıltepe
- Başak, Kızıltepe
- Bektaş, Kızıltepe
- Belli, Kızıltepe
- Beşdeğirmen, Kızıltepe
- Beşevler, Kızıltepe
- Beşik, Kızıltepe
- Bozhöyük, Kızıltepe
- Büyükayrık, Kızıltepe
- Büyükboğaziye, Kızıltepe
- Büyükdere, Kızıltepe
- Büyüktepe, Kızıltepe
- Cantaşı, Kızıltepe
- Çağıl, Kızıltepe
- Çakır, Kızıltepe
- Çamlıca, Kızıltepe
- Çamlıdere, Kızıltepe
- Çanaklı, Kızıltepe
- Çatalca, Kızıltepe
- Çaybaşı, Kızıltepe
- Çetinler, Kızıltepe
- Çınarcık, Kızıltepe
- Çıplak, Kızıltepe
- Çimenli, Kızıltepe
- Çitlibağ, Kızıltepe
- Damlalı, Kızıltepe
- Demet, Kızıltepe
- Demirci, Kızıltepe
- Demirkap, Kızıltepe
- Demirler, Kızıltepe
- Dikmen, Kızıltepe
- Doğanlı, Kızıltepe
- Dora, Kızıltepe
- Doyuran, Kızıltepe
- Dörtyol, Kızıltepe
- Düğürk, Kızıltepe
- Ekinlik, Kızıltepe
- Elbeyli, Kızıltepe
- Elmalı, Kızıltepe
- Erdem, Kızıltepe
- Erikli, Kızıltepe
- Eroğlu, Kızıltepe
- Esenli, Kızıltepe
- Eskin, Kızıltepe
- Eşme, Kızıltepe
- Eymirli, Kızıltepe
- Fesliğen, Kızıltepe
- Gökçe, Kızıltepe
- Göllü, Kızıltepe
- Gözlüce, Kızıltepe
- Gümüşdere, Kızıltepe
- Güneştepe, Kızıltepe
- Güngören, Kızıltepe
- Günlüce, Kızıltepe
- Gürmeşe, Kızıltepe
- Hacıhasan, Kızıltepe
- Hacıyusuf, Kızıltepe
- Hakverdi, Kızıltepe
- Halkalı, Kızıltepe
- Harmandüzü, Kızıltepe
- Haznedar, Kızıltepe
- Hocaköy, Kızıltepe
- Ilıcak, Kızıltepe
- Işıklar, Kızıltepe
- Işıkören, Kızıltepe
- İkikuyu, Kızıltepe
- İkizler, Kızıltepe
- İnandı, Kızıltepe
- Kalaycık, Kızıltepe
- Karabent, Kızıltepe
- Karakulak, Kızıltepe
- Karakuyu, Kızıltepe
- Karaman, Kızıltepe
- Kaşıklı, Kızıltepe
- Katarlı, Kızıltepe
- Kaynarca, Kızıltepe
- Kengerli, Kızıltepe
- Kılduman, Kızıltepe
- Kırkkuyu, Kızıltepe
- Kilimli, Kızıltepe
- Kocalar, Kızıltepe
- Koçlu, Kızıltepe
- Konuklu, Kızıltepe
- Köprübaşı, Kızıltepe
- Körsu, Kızıltepe
- Küçükayrık, Kızıltepe
- Küçükboğaziye, Kızıltepe
- Küplüce, Kızıltepe
- Odaköy, Kızıltepe
- Ofis, Kızıltepe
- Ortaköy, Kızıltepe
- Otluk, Kızıltepe
- Örencik, Kızıltepe
- Sancarlı, Kızıltepe
- Sandıklı, Kızıltepe
- Sarıca, Kızıltepe
- Saruhan, Kızıltepe
- Sevimli, Kızıltepe
- Soğanlı, Kızıltepe
- Sürekli, Kızıltepe
- Şenyurt Kızıltepe
- Tanrıverdi, Kızıltepe
- Tarlabaşı, Kızıltepe
- Taşlıca, Kızıltepe
- Tatlıca, Kızıltepe
- Tıraşlı, Kızıltepe
- Timurçiftliği, Kızıltepe
- Tosunlu, Kızıltepe
- Tuzla, Kızıltepe
- Tuzluca, Kızıltepe
- Ulaşlı, Kızıltepe
- Uluköy, Kızıltepe
- Uzunkaya, Kızıltepe
- Üçevler, Kızıltepe
- Ülker, Kızıltepe
- Yalınkılıç, Kızıltepe
- Yamaç, Kızıltepe
- Yarımca, Kızıltepe
- Yaşarköy, Kızıltepe
- Yayıklı, Kızıltepe
- Yaylım, Kızıltepe
- Yedikardeş,. Kızıltepe
- Yeşilköy,. Kızıltepe
- Yolaldı,. Kızıltepe
- Yoldere,. Kızıltepe
- Yolüstü, Kızıltepe
- Yoncalı, Kızıltepe
- Yukarıazıklı,. Kızıltepe
- Yumrutaş, Kızıltepe
- Yumurcak, Kızıltepe
- Yurtderi, Kızıltepe
- Yurtözü, Kızıltepe
- Yüceli, Kızıltepe
- Yüksektepe, Kızıltepe
- Ziyaret, Kızıltepe

== Mazıdağı ==
- Mazıdağı
- Aksu, Mazıdağı
- Arıköy, Mazıdağı
- Arısu, Mazıdağı
- Aşağıocak, Mazıdağı
- Atalar, Mazıdağı
- Atlıca, Mazıdağı
- Aykut, Mazıdağı
- Bahçecik, Mazıdağı
- Balpınar, Mazıdağı
- Bilge, Mazıdağı
- Çankaya, Mazıdağı
- Çayönü, Mazıdağı
- Derecik, Mazıdağı
- Dikyamaç, Mazıdağı
- Duraklı, Mazıdağı
- Ekinciler, Mazıdağı
- Engin, Mazıdağı
- Erdalı, Mazıdağı
- Evciler, Mazıdağı
- Gümüşpınar, Mazıdağı
- Gümüşyuva, Mazıdağı
- Gürgöze, Mazıdağı
- Işıkyaka, Mazıdağı
- İkisu, Mazıdağı
- Karaalani, Mazıdağı
- Karataş, Mazıdağı
- Kebapçı, Mazıdağı
- Kemerli, Mazıdağı
- Kışlak, Mazıdağı
- Kocakent, Mazıdağı
- Konur, Mazıdağı
- Meşeli, Mazıdağı
- Ortaklı, Mazıdağı
- Ömürlü, Mazıdağı
- Özlüce, Mazıdağı
- Sağmal, Mazıdağı
- Sakızlı, Mazıdağı
- Şanlı, Mazıdağı
- Şenyuva, Mazıdağı
- Tanrıyolu, Mazıdağı
- Tarlacık, Mazıdağı
- Ulutaş, Mazıdağı
- Ürünlü, Mazıdağı
- Yağmur, Mazıdağı
- Yalınağaç, Mazıdağı
- Yeşilköy, Mazıdağı
- Yetkinler, Mazıdağı
- Yukarıkonak, Mazıdağı
- Yukarıocak, Mazıdağı
- Yüce, Mazıdağı
- Yücebağ, Mazıdağı

== Midyat ==
- Midyat
- Acırlı, Midyat
- Adaklı, Midyat
- Alagöz, Midyat
- Altıntaş, Midyat
- Anıtlı, Midyat
- Bağlarbaşı, Midyat
- Bardakçı, Midyat
- Barıştepe, Midyat
- Başyurt, Midyat
- Budaklı, Midyat
- Çaldere, Midyat
- Çalpınar, Midyat
- Çamyurt, Midyat
- Çandarlı, Midyat
- Çavuşlu, Midyat
- Çayırlı, Midyat
- Danışman, Midyat
- Doğançay, Midyat
- Doğanyazı, Midyat
- Dolunay, Midyat
- Düzgeçit, Midyat
- Düzoba, Midyat
- Eğlence, Midyat
- Elbeğendi, Midyat
- Erişti, Midyat
- Gelinkaya, Midyat
- Gülgöze, Midyat
- Gülveren, Midyat
- Güngören, Midyat
- Güven, Midyat
- Hanlar, Midyat
- Harmanlı, Midyat
- İkizdere, Midyat
- İzbırak, Midyat
- Kayabaşı, Midyat
- Kayalar, Midyat
- Kayalıpınar, Midyat
- Kutlubey, Midyat
- Mercimekli, Midyat
- Narlı, Midyat
- Ortaca, Midyat
- Pelitli, Midyat
- Sarıkaya, Midyat
- Sarıköy, Midyat
- Sivrice, Midyat
- Söğütlü, Midyat
- Şenköy, Midyat
- Taşlıburç, Midyat
- Tepeli, Midyat
- Toptepe, Midyat
- Tulgalı, Midyat
- Üçağıl, Midyat
- Yayvantepe, Midyat
- Yemişli, Midyat
- Yenice, Midyat
- Yeşilöz, Midyat
- Yolbaşı, Midyat
- Yuvalı, Midyat
- Ziyaret, Midyat

== Nusaybin ==
- Nusaybin
- Açıkköy, Nusaybin
- Açıkyol, Nusaybin
- Akağıl, Nusaybin
- Akarsu, Nusaybin
- Akçatarla, Nusaybin
- Bahçebaşı, Nusaybin
- Bakacık, Nusaybin
- Balaban, Nusaybin
- Beylik, Nusaybin
- Büyükkardeş, Nusaybin
- Çağlar, Nusaybin
- Çalı, Nusaybin
- Çatalözü, Nusaybin
- Çiğdem, Nusaybin
- Çilesiz, Nusaybin
- Çölova, Nusaybin
- Dağiçi, Nusaybin
- Dallıağaç, Nusaybin
- Demirtepe, Nusaybin
- Dibek, Nusaybin
- Dirim, Nusaybin
- Doğanlı, Nusaybin
- Doğuş, Nusaybin
- Durakbaşı, Nusaybin
- Duruca, Nusaybin
- Düzce, Nusaybin
- Eskihisar, Nusaybin
- Eskimağara, Nusaybin
- Eskiyol, Nusaybin
- Girmeli, Nusaybin
- Görentepe, Nusaybin
- Günebakan, Nusaybin
- Günyurdu, Nusaybin
- Gürün, Nusaybin
- Güvenli, Nusaybin
- Hasantepe, Nusaybin
- Heybeli, Nusaybin
- İkiztepe, Nusaybin
- İlkadım, Nusaybin
- Kalecik, Nusaybin
- Kantar, Nusaybin
- Karacaköy, Nusaybin
- Kayadibi, Nusaybin
- Kocadağ, Nusaybin
- Kuruköy, Nusaybin
- Kuyular, Nusaybin
- Küçükkardeş, Nusaybin
- Nergizli, Nusaybin
- Odabaşı, Nusaybin
- Sınırtepe, Nusaybin
- Söğütlü, Nusaybin
- Taşköy, Nusaybin
- Tepealtı, Nusaybin
- Tepeören, Nusaybin
- Tepeüstü, Nusaybin
- Turgutlu, Nusaybin
- Üçköy, Nusaybin
- Üçyol, Nusaybin
- Yandere, Nusaybin
- Yavruköy, Nusaybin
- Yazyurdu, Nusaybin
- Yerköy, Nusaybin
- Yolbilen, Nusaybin
- Yolindi, Nusaybin

== Ömerli ==
- Ömerli
- Akyokuş, Ömerli
- Alıçlı, Ömerli
- Anıttepe, Ömerli
- Beşikkaya, Ömerli
- Çalışan, Ömerli
- Çatalyurt, Ömerli
- Çayıralanı, Ömerli
- Çınaraltı, Ömerli
- Çimenlik, Ömerli
- Duygulu, Ömerli
- Fıstıklı, Ömerli
- Göllü, Ömerli
- Güzelağaç, Ömerli
- Harmankaya, Ömerli
- Havuzbaşı, Ömerli
- Işıkdere, Ömerli
- İkipınar, Ömerli
- İkitepe, Ömerli
- Kayabalı, Ömerli
- Kayadere, Ömerli
- Kayagöze, Ömerli
- Kayaüstü, Ömerli
- Kaynakkaya, Ömerli
- Kocakuyu, Ömerli
- Kocasırt, Ömerli
- Kovanlı, Ömerli
- Kömürlü, Ömerli
- Mutluca, Ömerli
- Ovabaşı, Ömerli
- Öztaş, Ömerli
- Pınarcık, Ömerli
- Salihköy, Ömerli
- Sivritepe, Ömerli
- Sulakdere, Ömerli
- Taşgedik, Ömerli
- Taşlıca, Ömerli
- Tavuklu, Ömerli
- Tekkuyu, Ömerli
- Tokdere, Ömerli
- Topağaç, Ömerli
- Ünsallı, Ömerli
- Yaylatepe, Ömerli

== Savur ==
- Savur
- Akyürek, Savur
- Armutalan, Savur
- Bağyaka, Savur
- Başağaç, Savur
- Başkavak, Savur
- Bengisu, Savur
- Çınarönü, Savur
- Dereiçi, Savur
- Durusu, Savur
- Erkuran, Savur
- Gölbaşı, Savur
- Harmantepe, Savur
- Hisarkaya, Savur
- İçören, Savur
- İşgören, Savur
- Karaköy, Savur
- Kayacıklar, Savur
- Kayatepe, Savur
- Kırbalı, Savur
- Kırkdirek, Savur
- Kocahüyük, Savur
- Koşuyolu, Savur
- Köprülü, Savur
- Ormancık, Savur
- Pınardere, Savur
- Sancaklı, Savur
- Serenli, Savur
- Soylu, Savur
- Sürgücü, Savur
- Şenocak, Savur
- Taşlık, Savur
- Tokluca, Savur
- Üçerli, Savur
- Üçkavak, Savur
- Yaylayanı, Savur
- Yazır, Savur
- Yenilmez, Savur
- Yeşilalan, Savur

== Yeşilli ==
- Yeşilli
- Alıçlı, Yeşilli
- Bülbül, Yeşilli
- Dereyanı, Yeşilli
- Koyunlu, Yeşilli
- Kütüklü, Yeşilli
- Ovaköy, Yeşilli
- Sancar, Yeşilli
- Uzunköy, Yeşilli
- Zeytinli, Yeşilli

== Recent development ==
According to Law act no 6360, all Turkish provinces with a population more than 750 000, were renamed as metropolitan municipality. Furthermore, the central district was renamed as Artuklu. All districts in those provinces became second level municipalities and all villages in those districts were renamed as a neighborhoods . Thus the villages listed above are officially neighborhoods of Mardin.
