= Tanrıverdi =

Tanrıverdi can refer to:

- Tanrıverdi, Kızıltepe, neighborhood in Kızıltepe district, Mardin Province, Turkey
- Nuran Tanrıverdi, Turkish architect and painter
