= Sevimli =

Sevimli may refer to:

- Sevimli, Hanak, [ქართულად : ველი]a village in the Hanak District, Ardahan Province, Turkey
- Sevimli, Kızıltepe, a neighbourhood in the municipality and district of Kızıltepe, Mardin Province, Turkey
