= Atmaca (disambiguation) =

Atmaca is a Turkish long range, anti-ship, surface-to-surface and submarine-launched cruise missile.

Atmaca may also refer to:

== People ==
- Alara Atmaca (born 2009), Turkish female fencer
- Dildar Atmaca (born 2002), German footballer of Turkish descent

== Places ==
- Atmaca, Kızıltepe, a neighborhood of Kızıltepe District in Mardin province, Turkey
