= Akdoğan =

Akdoğan is a Turkish word meaning "gyrfalcon" and may refer to:

== People ==
- İlayda Akdoğan (born 1998), Turkish actress
- İlknur Akdoğan (born 1969), Turkish windsurfer
- Necla Akdoğan (born 1971), Turkish women's footballer, referee and manager
- Nihat Akdoğan (born 1980), Turkish politician
- Ricky Haydari Akdoğan (born 1999), known as Ricky Rich, Swedish rapper
- Tuncay Akdoğan (1959–2004), Turkish musician and record producer
- Yalçın Akdoğan (born 1969), Turkish politician and former government minister
- Yildiz Akdogan (born 1973), Turkish-Danish politician

== Places ==
- Akdoğan, Devrekani, a village in Turkey
- Akdoğan, Kahta, a village in Turkey
- Akdoğan, Kastamonu, a village in Turkey
- Akdoğan, Kızılcahamam, a village in Turkey
- Akdoğan, Kızıltepe, a village in Turkey
- Akdoğan, Taşköprü, a village in Turkey
- Lysi, a village in Cyprus, whose Turkish name is Akdoğan
- Lake Akdoğan, a lake in Varto district of Muş Province, Turkey
