= Nilüfer Elik Yılmaz =

Kurdish politician

Mayor of Kızıltepe
- In office March 2019 – November 2019
- Succeeded by: Hüseyin Cam

Personal details
- Born: 1962 (age 63–64) Mardin
- Party: Peoples' Democratic Party

Nilüfer Elik Yılmaz (born 1962, Mardin, Turkey) is a Kurdish politician and a former member of the Peace and Democracy Party (BDP) and Mayor of Kiziltepe for the Peoples' Democratic Party (HDP).

== Education ==
Nilüfer Elik Yılmaz received her primary and secondary education and attended high school in Kiziltepe. Following, she began to study economics at the Anadolu University in Eskisehir, but did not graduate.

== Political career ==
She was a member of the women's assembly of the BDP. Additionally she took a seat in the disciplinary council of the parties Madrid branch. In the local elections in March 2019, she was elected as a mayor of Kiziltepe for the HDP with more than 70% of the voter-share. During her tenure, the municipality supported the local football club. She was dismissed from office in November 2019 on grounds of her activities in the Democratic Society Congress (DTK) which was viewed as an indication of a membership in the forbidden Kurdistan Workers Party (PKK). The ministry of the interior replaced her with the state appointed trustee Hüseyin Cam, who assumed as an acting mayor in her stead. The same months, she was arrested and imprisoned in prison in Mardin. Later she was transferred into a prison in Tarsus. On the 17 March 2021, the state prosecutor Bekir Şahin demanded for her and 686 other HDP politicians a five-year ban to a political activity together with a closure of the HDP due to organizational links with the PKK.
