= Bozhüyük, Kızıltepe =

Village in Mardin Province, Turkey

Bozhüyük
- Neighbourhood
- Location in Turkey
- Coordinates: 37.078°N 40.225°E
- Country: Turkey
- Province: Mardin
- District: Kızıltepe
- Population (2021): 1,107
- Time zone: UTC+3 (TRT)

Bozhüyük (Kurdish: Til Edes) is a neighbourhood in the municipality and district of Kızıltepe, Mardin Province in Turkey. The village is populated by Kurds of the Xalecan tribe and had a population of 1,107 in 2021.
