= Güçlü, Kızıltepe =

Village in Mardin Province, Turkey

Güçlü
- Neighbourhood
- Location in Turkey
- Coordinates: 37.141°N 40.674°E
- Country: Turkey
- Province: Mardin
- District: Kızıltepe
- Population (2021): 135
- Time zone: UTC+3 (TRT)

Güçlü (Kurdish: Mecburiye) is a neighbourhood in the municipality and district of Kızıltepe, Mardin Province in Turkey. The village is populated by Kurds of the Kîkan tribe and had a population of 135 in 2021.
