= Kahraman, Kızıltepe =

Village in Mardin Province, Turkey

Kahraman
- Neighbourhood
- Location in Turkey
- Coordinates: 37.190°N 40.535°E
- Country: Turkey
- Province: Mardin
- District: Kızıltepe
- Population (2021): 253
- Time zone: UTC+3 (TRT)

Kahraman (Kurdish: Qehreman) is a neighbourhood in the municipality and district of Kızıltepe, Mardin Province in Turkey. The village is populated by Kurds of the Şêxan tribe and had a population of 253 in 2021.
