= Yeşilköy, Kızıltepe =

Village in Mardin Province, Turkey

Yeşilköy
- Neighbourhood
- Location in Turkey
- Coordinates: 37.182°N 40.441°E
- Country: Turkey
- Province: Mardin
- District: Kızıltepe
- Population (2021): 65
- Time zone: UTC+3 (TRT)

Yeşilköy (Kurdish: Xanika) is a neighbourhood in the municipality and district of Kızıltepe, Mardin Province in Turkey. The village is populated by Kurds of the Erbanî and Xalecan tribes and had a population of 65 in 2021.
