= Tuzlaköy, Kızıltepe =

Village in Mardin Province, Turkey

Tuzlaköy
- Neighbourhood
- Location in Turkey
- Coordinates: 37.290°N 40.631°E
- Country: Turkey
- Province: Mardin
- District: Kızıltepe
- Population (2021): 28
- Time zone: UTC+3 (TRT)

Tuzlaköy (Kurdish: Bavina, Melho) is a neighbourhood in the municipality and district of Kızıltepe, Mardin Province in Turkey. The village is populated by Kurds of the Xurs tribe and had a population of 28 in 2021.
