= Kayapınar, Kızıltepe =

Village in Mardin Province, Turkey

Kayapınar
- Neighbourhood
- Location in Turkey
- Coordinates: 37.079°N 40.294°E
- Country: Turkey
- Province: Mardin
- District: Kızıltepe
- Population (2021): 495
- Time zone: UTC+3 (TRT)

Kayapınar (Kurdish: Tahtoka Hecî Seîd) is a neighbourhood in the municipality and district of Kızıltepe, Mardin Province in Turkey. The village is populated by Kurds of the Xalecan tribe and had a population of 495 in 2021.

== History ==
Kayapınar; was previously a village as an administrative division, but became a neighbourhood after the law change in 2012.
