= Fındıktepe, Kızıltepe =

Village in Mardin Province, Turkey

Fındıktepe
- Neighbourhood
- Location in Turkey
- Coordinates: 37.103°N 40.551°E
- Country: Turkey
- Province: Mardin
- District: Kızıltepe
- Population (2021): 85
- Time zone: UTC+3 (TRT)

Fındıktepe (Kurdish: Gundê Hecî Elî, Areko) is a neighbourhood in the municipality and district of Kızıltepe, Mardin Province in Turkey. It is populated by Kurds of the Kîkan tribe and had a population of 85 in 2021.
