= Yamanlar, Kızıltepe =

Village in Mardin Province, Turkey

Yamanlar
- Neighbourhood
- Location in Turkey
- Coordinates: 37.240°N 40.531°E
- Country: Turkey
- Province: Mardin
- District: Kızıltepe
- Population (2021): 346
- Time zone: UTC+3 (TRT)

Yamanlar (Kurdish: Kanîsor) is a neighbourhood in the municipality and district of Kızıltepe, Mardin Province in Turkey. The village is populated by Kurds of the Erbanî tribe and had a population of 346 in 2021.
