= Ülkerköy, Kızıltepe =

Village in Mardin Province, Turkey

Ülkerköy
- Neighbourhood
- Location in Turkey
- Coordinates: 37.110°N 40.418°E
- Country: Turkey
- Province: Mardin
- District: Kızıltepe
- Population (2021): 114
- Time zone: UTC+3 (TRT)

Ülkerköy (Kurdish: Dêrika Smaîl Axa) is a neighbourhood in the municipality and district of Kızıltepe, Mardin Province in Turkey. The village is populated by Kurds of the Xalecan tribe and had a population of 114 in 2021.
