= Bektaş, Kızıltepe =

Village in Mardin Province, Turkey

Bektaş
- Neighbourhood
- Location in Turkey
- Coordinates: 37.123°N 40.439°E
- Country: Turkey
- Province: Mardin
- District: Kızıltepe
- Population (2021): 409
- Time zone: UTC+3 (TRT)

Bektaş (Arabic: بكدشيّة; Kurdish: Bektaşî; Syriac: ܒܓܕܐܫܝܗ, romanized: Bagdashiyya) (Note: Alteratively transliterated as Baghdashiya.) is a neighbourhood in the municipality and district of Kızıltepe, Mardin Province in Turkey. The village is populated by Kurds of the Xalecan tribe and had a population of 409 in 2021.

== History ==
The Syriac Orthodox Monastery of Mor Barṣawmo, located between Bagdashiyya (today called Bektaş) and Ḥashray, is attested in the 12th–13th centuries and was rebuilt by Yuhanna, metropolitan of Mardin (r. 1125–1165), who also built a church at Bagdashiyya. According to Michel Le Quien, there was a bishop of Bagdashiyya named John in 1210 (AG 1521). The priest Abraham of Bagdashiyya (fl. 1314) was a notable calligrapher.

== Bibliography ==
- Barsoum, Aphrem (2003). The Scattered Pearls: A History of Syriac Literature and Sciences. Translated by Matti Moosa (2nd ed.). Gorgias Press.
- Barsoum, Aphrem (2008). History of the Za'faran Monastery. Translated by Matti Moosa. Gorgias Press.
- Fiey, Jean Maurice (1993). Pour un Oriens Christianus Novus: Répertoire des diocèses syriaques orientaux et occidentaux (in French).
- Takahashi, Hidemi (2011). "Barṣawmo, Dayro d-Mor". In Sebastian P. Brock; Aaron M. Butts; George A. Kiraz; Lucas Van Rompay (eds.). Gorgias Encyclopedic Dictionary of the Syriac Heritage. Gorgias Press. p. 60.
- Le Quien, Michel (1740). Oriens christianus : in quatuor patriarchatus digestus : quo exhibentur ecclesiae, patriarchae caeterique praesules totius orientis (in Latin). Vol. II.
- Tan, Altan (2018). Turabidin'den Berriye'ye. Aşiretler - Dinler - Diller - Kültürler (in Turkish). ISBN 9789944360944.
