= Beritan Güneş Altın =

Turkish psychologist and politician

Beritan Günes Altın MP

Member of the Grand National Assembly
- Incumbent
- Assumed office 2 June 2023
- Constituency: Mardin (2023)

Personal details
- Born: 1995 (age 30–31) Kızıltepe, Mardin, Turkey
- Party: Green Left Party (YSP)
- Education: Psychologist
- Alma mater: Yıldırım Beyazıt University, Ankara

Beritan Güneş Altın (born 1995 Kiziltepe, Turkey) is a psychologist and politician. Since June 2023, she is a member of the Grand National Assembly of Turkey representing Mardin for the Green Left Party (YSP).

== Early life and education ==
Beritan Güneş Altın was born in Kızıltepe and attended primary and secondary school in Diyarbakir. She graduated from high school in Mardin. Following she studied psychology at the Yildirim Beyazit University in Ankara.

== Professional career ==
After graduating she worked with Yazidi refugees which she assisted in Kurdish language and became a writer for a Kurdish Jineology magazine. She is also a member of the Institute of Psychologists in Mesopotamia (DER-MEZ). With the DER-MEZ, she was involved in establishing a psychological assistance to earthquake victims in the languages Kurdish, Arabic and Turkish.

== Political career ==
In the parliamentary elections of May 2023, Beritan Güneş Altın was elected into the Grand National Assembly of Turkey representing the Mardin district for the YSP. In parliament, she aims to defend women rights and establishing assistance to earthquake victims.
