= Başdeğirmen, Kızıltepe =

Village in Mardin Province, Turkey

Başdeğirmen
- Neighbourhood
- Location in Turkey
- Coordinates: 37.270°N 40.547°E
- Country: Turkey
- Province: Mardin
- District: Kızıltepe
- Population (2021): 145
- Time zone: UTC+3 (TRT)

Başdeğirmen (Kurdish: Amrudî) is a neighbourhood in the municipality and district of Kızıltepe, Mardin Province in Turkey. The village is populated by Kurds of non-tribal affiliation and had a population of 145 in 2021.
