= Demirler, Kızıltepe =

Village in Mardin Province, Turkey

Demirler
- Neighbourhood
- Location in Turkey
- Coordinates: 37.162°N 40.511°E
- Country: Turkey
- Province: Mardin
- District: Kızıltepe
- Population (2021): 191
- Time zone: UTC+3 (TRT)

Demirler (Kurdish: Gundê Fereco, Temûran) is a neighbourhood in the municipality and district of Kızıltepe, Mardin Province in Turkey. The village is populated by Kurds of the Xalecan tribe and had a population of 191 in 2021.
