= Demet, Kızıltepe =

Village in Mardin Province, Turkey

Demet
- Neighbourhood
- Location in Turkey
- Coordinates: 37.233°N 40.414°E
- Country: Turkey
- Province: Mardin
- District: Kızıltepe
- Population (2021): 465
- Time zone: UTC+3 (TRT)

Demet (Kurdish: Gola Darê) is a neighbourhood in the municipality and district of Kızıltepe, Mardin Province in Turkey. The village is populated by Kurdish-speaking Arabs who are of the Erbanî tribe. The villagers are of Tayy descent. The village had a population of 465 in 2021.
