= Ortaköy, Kızıltepe =

Village in Mardin Province, Turkey

Ortaköy
- Neighbourhood
- Location in Turkey
- Coordinates: 37.086°N 40.493°E
- Country: Turkey
- Province: Mardin
- District: Kızıltepe
- Population (2021): 26
- Time zone: UTC+3 (TRT)

Ortaköy (Kurdish: Girik) is a neighbourhood in the municipality and district of Kızıltepe, Mardin Province in Turkey. The village is populated by Kurds of the Xalêcan Kurdish tribe and had a population of 26 in 2021.
