= Doğuş, Nusaybin =

Village in Mardin Province, Turkey

Doğuş
- Neighbourhood
- Location in Turkey
- Coordinates: 37.192°N 41.040°E
- Country: Turkey
- Province: Mardin
- District: Nusaybin
- Population (2021): 139
- Time zone: UTC+3 (TRT)

Doğuş (Kurdish: Qûzo) is a neighbourhood in the municipality and district of Nusaybin, Mardin Province in Turkey. The village is populated by Kurds of the Omerkan tribe and had a population of 139 in 2021.
