= Kalecik, Nusaybin =

Village in Mardin Province, Turkey

Kalecik
- Neighbourhood
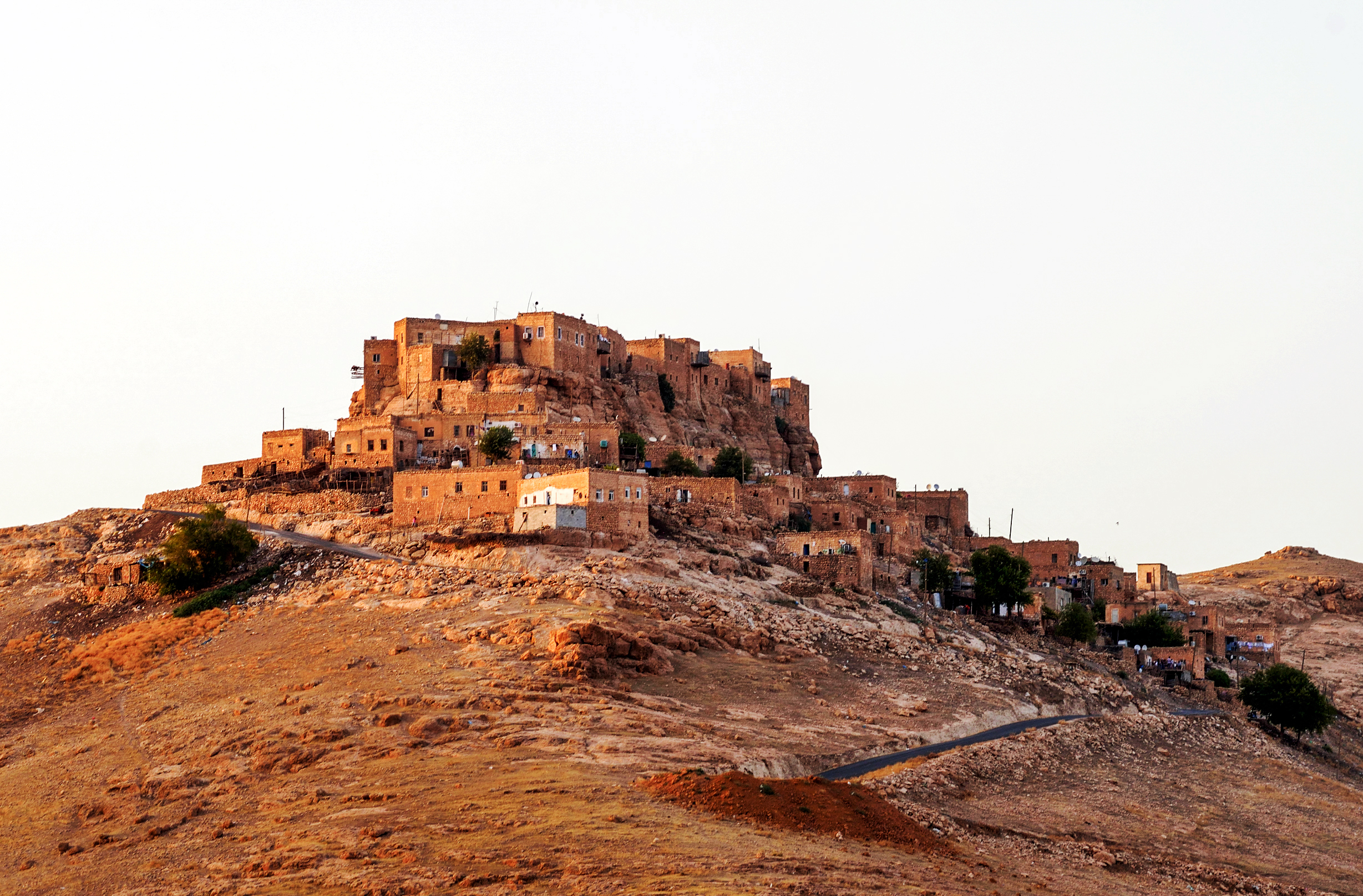

- Location within Turkey
- Coordinates: 37.150°N 41.242°E
- Country: Turkey
- Province: Mardin
- District: Nusaybin
- Population (2021): 145
- Time zone: UTC+3 (TRT)

Kalecik (Kurdish: Kelehê, Keleha Bûnûsra) is a neighbourhood in the municipality and district of Nusaybin, Mardin Province in Turkey. The village is populated by Kurds of the Koçekan tribe and had a population of 145 in 2021.
