= Çimenli, Kızıltepe =

Village in Mardin Province, Turkey

Çimenli
- Neighbourhood
- Location in Turkey
- Coordinates: 37.302°N 40.475°E
- Country: Turkey
- Province: Mardin
- District: Kızıltepe
- Population (2021): 121
- Time zone: UTC+3 (TRT)

Çimenli (Kurdish: Mergê) is a neighbourhood in the municipality and district of Kızıltepe, Mardin Province in Turkey. The village is populated by Kurds of the Erbanî tribe and had a population of 121 in 2021.
