= Sürekli, Kızıltepe =

Village in Mardin Province, Turkey

Sürekli
- Neighbourhood

- Location within Turkey
- Coordinates: 37.197°N 40.398°E
- Country: Turkey
- Province: Mardin
- District: Kızıltepe
- Population (2021): 2,188
- Time zone: UTC+3 (TRT)

Sürekli (Kurdish: Diêmê) is a neighbourhood in the municipality and district of Kızıltepe, Mardin Province in Turkey. The village is populated by Kurds of the Erbanî tribe and had a population of 2,118 in 2021.
