= Işıklar, Kızıltepe =

Village in Mardin Province, Turkey

Işıklar
- Neighbourhood
- Location in Turkey
- Coordinates: 37.186°N 40.541°E
- Country: Turkey
- Province: Mardin
- District: Kızıltepe
- Population (2021): 655
- Time zone: UTC+3 (TRT)

Işıklar (Kurdish: Birahîmiyê; Syriac: Al-Ibrāhīmiyyah) (Note: Alternatively transliterated as Abrahamiya, Brahemiye, Brahîmîye, Brahīmīyyah, Ibrahimie, Ibrahimié, Ibrahimiyeh, Ibrāhimiyyah, Ibrahimiye, or İbrahimiye.) is a village in the municipality and district of Kızıltepe, Mardin Province in Turkey. The village is populated by Kurds of the Kîkan tribe and had a population of 655 in 2021.

In the village, there is a Syriac Orthodox church of Morī Gewargīs.

== History ==
Al-Ibrāhīmiyyah (today called Işıklar) was historically inhabited by Syriac Orthodox Christians. The Syriac Orthodox patriarch Ignatius John XIV (r. 1483–1492) renovated the village's church with a new altar. 2 priests were ordained for the Church of Morī Gewargīs at the end of October 1574 (AG 1885). In the Syriac Orthodox patriarchal register of dues of 1870, it was recorded that the village had 35 households, who paid 158 dues, and did not have a priest. There was also an Armenian Catholic community at the village. Al-Ibrāhīmiyyah was attacked, plundered, and nearly completely burned down by Kurdish tribesmen amidst the Hamidian massacres in 1895.

In 1914, it was inhabited by 400 Syriacs, according to the list presented to the Paris Peace Conference by the Assyro-Chaldean delegation. There were 10 Syriac Orthodox families in 1915. It was mostly populated by Syriac Catholic Christians, but there were also some recent Protestant converts. There were 60 Christian families at Al-Ibrāhīmiyyah. Amidst the Sayfo, most of the population of Al-Ibrāhīmiyyah fled to Tell Armen in late June and took refuge at the Armenian Catholic building, where they were massacred on 25 June 1915.

By 1966, there were eight Syriac Orthodox families at Al-Ibrāhīmiyyah. Restoration of the Church of Morī Gewargīs at Al-Ibrāhīmiyyah, which had been abandoned and left in disuse for many years, began in 2015. Upon completion of the church's restoration, Mass was celebrated there for the first time in over a century on 5 June 2022, however, consequently the only Christian family at the village was immediately attacked by at least 50 Muslims, who set fire to the family's fields and threatened them to leave the village.

== Bibliography ==
- Bcheiry, Iskandar (2009). The Syriac Orthodox Patriarchal Register of Dues of 1870: An Unpublished Historical Document from the Late Ottoman Period. Gorgias Press.
- Bcheiry, Iskandar (2010). A List of Syriac Orthodox Ecclesiastic Ordinations from the Sixteenth and Seventeenth Century: The Syriac Manuscript of Hunt 444 (Syr 68 in Bodleian Library, Oxford). Gorgias Press.
- Bcheiry, Iskandar (2013). The Account of the Syriac Orthodox Patriarch Yūḥanun Bar Šay Allāh (1483–1492): The Syriac Manuscript of Cambridge: DD.3.8(1). Gorgias Press.
- Bcheiry, Iskandar (2019). "Digitizing and Schematizing the Archival Material from the Late Ottoman Period Found in the Monastery of al-Zaʿfarān in Southeast Turkey". Atla Summary of Proceedings. 72 (January): 50–61. doi:10.31046/proceedings.2018.113.
- Brock, Sebastian (2017). "A Historical Note of October 1915 Written in Dayro D-Zafaran (Deyrulzafaran)". In David Gaunt; Naures Atto; Soner O. Barthoma (eds.). Let Them Not Return: Sayfo – The Genocide against the Assyrian, Syriac and Chaldean Christians in the Ottoman Empire (PDF). pp. 148–156.
- Dinno, Khalid S. (2017). The Syrian Orthodox Christians in the Late Ottoman Period and Beyond: Crisis then Revival. Gorgias Press.
- Gaunt, David (2006). Massacres, Resistance, Protectors: Muslim-Christian Relations in Eastern Anatolia during World War I. Gorgias Press.
- Jongerden, Joost; Verheij, Jelle, eds. (2012). Social Relations in Ottoman Diyarbekir, 1870-1915. Brill.
- Tan, Altan (2018). Turabidin'den Berriye'ye. Aşiretler - Dinler - Diller - Kültürler (in Turkish). Pak Ajans Yayincilik Turizm Ve Diş Ticaret Limited şirketi. ISBN 9789944360944.
