= Büyükdere, Kızıltepe =

Village in Mardin Province, Turkey

Büyükdere
- Neighbourhood
- Location in Turkey
- Coordinates: 37.056°N 40.458°E
- Country: Turkey
- Province: Mardin
- District: Kızıltepe
- Population (2021): 357
- Time zone: UTC+3 (TRT)

Büyükdere (Kurdish: Bûnasê) is a neighbourhood in the municipality and district of Kızıltepe, Mardin Province in Turkey. The village is populated by Kurds of the Xalecan tribe and had a population of 357 in 2021.
