= İkizler, Kızıltepe =

Village in Mardin Province, Turkey

İkizler
- Neighbourhood
- Location in Turkey
- Coordinates: 37.057°N 40.399°E
- Country: Turkey
- Province: Mardin
- District: Kızıltepe
- Population (2021): 71
- Time zone: UTC+3 (TRT)

İkizler (Kurdish: Dûbîrka) is a neighbourhood in the municipality and district of Kızıltepe, Mardin Province in Turkey. The village is populated by Kurds of the Xalecan tribe and had a population of 71 in 2021.
