= Çaybaşı, Kızıltepe =

Village in Mardin Province, Turkey

Çaybaşı
- Neighbourhood
- Location in Turkey
- Coordinates: 37.157°N 40.510°E
- Country: Turkey
- Province: Mardin
- District: Kızıltepe
- Population (2021): 416
- Time zone: UTC+3 (TRT)

Çaybaşı (Kurdish: Biêcî) is a neighbourhood in the municipality and district of Kızıltepe, Mardin Province in Turkey. The village is populated by Kurds of the Xalecan tribe and had a population of 416 in 2021.
