= Odaköy, Kızıltepe =

Village in Mardin Province, Turkey

Odaköy
- Neighbourhood
- Location in Turkey
- Coordinates: 36.992°N 40.213°E
- Country: Turkey
- Province: Mardin
- District: Kızıltepe
- Population (2021): 567
- Time zone: UTC+3 (TRT)

Odaköy (Kurdish: Oda) is a neighbourhood in the municipality and district of Kızıltepe, Mardin Province in Turkey. The village is populated by Kurds of the Xalecan tribe and had a population of 567 in 2021.
