= Dörtyol, Kızıltepe =

Village in Mardin Province, Turkey

Dörtyol
- Neighbourhood
- Location in Turkey
- Coordinates: 37.207°N 40.470°E
- Country: Turkey
- Province: Mardin
- District: Kızıltepe
- Population (2021): 260
- Time zone: UTC+3 (TRT)

Dörtyol (Kurdish: Tiltîn) is a neighbourhood in the municipality and district of Kızıltepe, Mardin Province in Turkey. The village is populated by Kurds of the Erbanî tribe and had a population of 260 in 2021.
