= Kocalar, Kızıltepe =

Village in Mardin Province, Turkey

Kocalar
- Neighbourhood
- Location in Turkey
- Coordinates: 37.267°N 40.644°E
- Country: Turkey
- Province: Mardin
- District: Kızıltepe
- Population (2021): 460
- Time zone: UTC+3 (TRT)

Kocalar (Kurdish: Hecî Feris) is a neighbourhood in the municipality and district of Kızıltepe, Mardin Province in Turkey. The village is predominantly populated by Kurds of the Xurs tribe and had a population of 460 in 2021.

Arabs constitute one quarter of the village.
