= Eroğlu, Kızıltepe =

Village in Mardin Province, Turkey

Eroğlu
- Neighbourhood
- Location in Turkey
- Coordinates: 37.242°N 40.630°E
- Country: Turkey
- Province: Mardin
- District: Kızıltepe
- Population (2021): 446
- Time zone: UTC+3 (TRT)

Eroğlu (Kurdish: Xanika Herzem) is a neighbourhood in the municipality and district of Kızıltepe, Mardin Province in Turkey. The village had a population of 446 in 2021.
