= Akçatarla, Nusaybin =

Village in Mardin Province, Turkey

Akçatarla
- Neighbourhood
- Location in Turkey
- Coordinates: 37.129°N 41.165°E
- Country: Turkey
- Province: Mardin
- District: Nusaybin
- Population (2021): 1,476
- Time zone: UTC+3 (TRT)

Akçatarla (Kurdish: Dal) is a neighbourhood in the municipality and district of Nusaybin, Mardin Province in Turkey. The village is populated by Kurds of the Koçekan tribe and had a population of 1,476 in 2021.
