= Yurtözü, Kızıltepe =

Village in Mardin Province, Turkey

Yurtözü
- Neighbourhood
- Location in Turkey
- Coordinates: 37.082°N 40.501°E
- Country: Turkey
- Province: Mardin
- District: Kızıltepe
- Population (2021): 53
- Time zone: UTC+3 (TRT)

Yurtözü (Kurdish: Cabo, Çabol) is a neighbourhood in the municipality and district of Kızıltepe, Mardin Province in Turkey. The village is populated by Kurds of the Kîkan tribe and had a population of 53 in 2021.
