= Erdem, Kızıltepe =

Village in Mardin Province, Turkey

Erdem
- Neighbourhood
- Location in Turkey
- Coordinates: 37.304°N 40.621°E
- Country: Turkey
- Province: Mardin
- District: Kızıltepe
- Population (2021): 56
- Time zone: UTC+3 (TRT)

Erdem (Kurdish: Meşkina) is a neighbourhood in the municipality and district of Kızıltepe, Mardin Province in Turkey. The village is populated by Kurds of the Xurs tribe and had a population of 56 in 2021.
