= Hakverdi, Kızıltepe =

Village in Mardin Province, Turkey

Hakverdi
- Neighbourhood
- Location in Turkey
- Coordinates: 37.167°N 40.442°E
- Country: Turkey
- Province: Mardin
- District: Kızıltepe
- Population (2021): 411
- Time zone: UTC+3 (TRT)

Hakverdi (Kurdish: Melelîk, Mala Elîkê) is a neighbourhood in the municipality and district of Kızıltepe, Mardin Province in Turkey. The village is populated by Kurds of the Xalecan tribe and had a population of 411 in 2021.
