= Yayıklı, Kızıltepe =

Village in Mardin Province, Turkey

Yayıklı
- Neighbourhood
- Location in Turkey
- Coordinates: 37.157°N 40.360°E
- Country: Turkey
- Province: Mardin
- District: Kızıltepe
- Population (2021): 230
- Time zone: UTC+3 (TRT)

Yayıklı (Kurdish: Cirdo'i) is a neighbourhood in the municipality and district of Kızıltepe, Mardin Province in Turkey. The village is populated by Kurds of the Xalecan tribe and had a population of 230 in 2021.
