= Kalaycık, Kızıltepe =

Village in Mardin Province, Turkey

Kalaycık
- Neighbourhood
- Location in Turkey
- Coordinates: 37.213°N 40.444°E
- Country: Turkey
- Province: Mardin
- District: Kızıltepe
- Population (2021): 239
- Time zone: UTC+3 (TRT)

Kalaycık (Kurdish: Qelaçiye) is a neighbourhood in the municipality and district of Kızıltepe, Mardin Province in Turkey. The village is populated by Kurds of the Erbanî tribe and had a population of 239 in 2021.
