= Kuruköy, Nusaybin =

Village in Mardin Province, Turkey

Kuruköy
- Neighbourhood
- Location in Turkey
- Coordinates: 37.241°N 41.034°E
- Country: Turkey
- Province: Mardin
- District: Nusaybin
- Population (2021): 315
- Time zone: UTC+3 (TRT)

Kuruköy (Kurdish: Xerabê Bava) is a neighbourhood in the municipality and district of Nusaybin, Mardin Province in Turkey. The village is populated by Kurds of the Omerkan tribe and had a population of 315 in 2021.
