= Hacıyusuf, Kızıltepe =

Village in Mardin Province, Turkey

Hacıyusuf
- Neighbourhood
- Location in Turkey
- Coordinates: 37.227°N 40.571°E
- Country: Turkey
- Province: Mardin
- District: Kızıltepe
- Population (2021): 60
- Time zone: UTC+3 (TRT)

Hacıyusuf (Kurdish: Hecî Yûsif) is a neighbourhood in the municipality and district of Kızıltepe, Mardin Province in Turkey. The village had a population of 60 in 2021.
