= Karaman, Kızıltepe =

Village in Mardin Province, Turkey

Karaman
- Neighbourhood
- Location in Turkey
- Coordinates: 37.278°N 40.639°E
- Country: Turkey
- Province: Mardin
- District: Kızıltepe
- Population (2021): 99
- Time zone: UTC+3 (TRT)

Karaman is a neighbourhood in the municipality and district of Kızıltepe, Mardin Province in Turkey. The village is populated by Arabs and had a population of 99 in 2021.
