= Çölova, Nusaybin =

Village in Mardin Province, Turkey

Çölova
- Neighbourhood
- Location in Turkey
- Coordinates: 37.110°N 41.103°E
- Country: Turkey
- Province: Mardin
- District: Nusaybin
- Population (2021): 244
- Time zone: UTC+3 (TRT)

Çölova (Kurdish: Menderê) is a neighbourhood in the municipality and district of Nusaybin, Mardin Province in Turkey. It is populated by Kurds of the Bubilan tribe and had a population of 244 in 2021.
