= Ilıcak, Kızıltepe =

Village in Mardin Province, Turkey

Ilıcak
- Neighbourhood
- Location in Turkey
- Coordinates: 37.178°N 40.624°E
- Country: Turkey
- Province: Mardin
- District: Kızıltepe
- Population (2021): 336
- Time zone: UTC+3 (TRT)

Ilıcak (Kurdish: Rasilhimam) is a neighbourhood in the municipality and district of Kızıltepe, Mardin Province in Turkey. The village is populated by Kurds of the Kîkan tribe and had a population of 336 in 2021.
