= Güneştepe, Kızıltepe =

Village in Mardin Province, Turkey

Güneştepe
- Neighbourhood
- Location in Turkey
- Coordinates: 37.141°N 40.519°E
- Country: Turkey
- Province: Mardin
- District: Kızıltepe
- Population (2021): 98
- Time zone: UTC+3 (TRT)

Güneştepe (Kurdish: Xerabê Şemsan) is a neighbourhood in the municipality and district of Kızıltepe, Mardin Province in Turkey. It is populated by Kurds of the Kîkan tribe and had a population of 98 in 2021.
