= Günlüce, Kızıltepe =

Village in Mardin Province, Turkey

Günlüce
- Neighbourhood
- Location in Turkey
- Coordinates: 37.127°N 40.562°E
- Country: Turkey
- Province: Mardin
- District: Kızıltepe
- Population (2021): 493
- Time zone: UTC+3 (TRT)

Günlüce (Kurdish: Kanîspî) is a neighbourhood in the municipality and district of Kızıltepe, Mardin Province in Turkey. The village is populated by Kurds of the Kîkan tribe and had a population of 493 in 2021.
