= Karacaköy, Nusaybin =

Village in Mardin Province, Turkey

Karacaköy
- Neighbourhood
- Location in Turkey
- Coordinates: 37.293°N 41.073°E
- Country: Turkey
- Province: Mardin
- District: Nusaybin
- Population (2021): 32
- Time zone: UTC+3 (TRT)

Karacaköy (Kurdish: Xerabê Reşik) is a neighbourhood in the municipality and district of Nusaybin, Mardin Province in Turkey. The village is populated by Kurds of the Omerkan tribe and had a population of 32 in 2021.
