= Büyükboğaziye, Kızıltepe =

Village in Mardin Province, Turkey

Küçükboğaziye
- Neighbourhood
- Location in Turkey
- Coordinates: 36.970°N 40.298°E
- Country: Turkey
- Province: Mardin
- District: Kızıltepe
- Population (2021): 1,190
- Time zone: UTC+3 (TRT)

Küçükboğaziye (Kurdish: Boxaziya biçûk) is a neighbourhood in the municipality and district of Kızıltepe, Mardin Province in Turkey. The village is populated by Kurds of the Xalecan tribe and had a population of 1,190 in 2021.
