= Yalınkılıç, Kızıltepe =

Village in Mardin Province, Turkey

Yalınkılıç
- Neighbourhood
- Location in Turkey
- Coordinates: 37.205°N 40.436°E
- Country: Turkey
- Province: Mardin
- District: Kızıltepe
- Population (2021): 381
- Time zone: UTC+3 (TRT)

Yalınkılıç (Kurdish: Xanika Silo) is a neighbourhood in the municipality and district of Kızıltepe, Mardin Province in Turkey. The village is populated by Kurds of the Erbanî tribe and had a population of 381 in 2021.
