= Küçükboğaziye, Kızıltepe =

Village in Mardin Province, Turkey

Küçükboğaziye
- Neighbourhood
- Location in Turkey
- Coordinates: 36.935°N 40.270°E
- Country: Turkey
- Province: Mardin
- District: Kızıltepe
- Population (2021): 585
- Time zone: UTC+3 (TRT)

Küçükboğaziye (Kurdish: Boxaziya biçûk) is a neighbourhood in the municipality and district of Kızıltepe, Mardin Province in Turkey. The village is populated by Kurds of the Kîkan and Xalecan tribes and had a population of 585 in 2021.
