= Beşevler, Kızıltepe =

Village in Mardin Province, Turkey

Beşevler
- Neighbourhood
- Location in Turkey
- Coordinates: 37.167°N 40.618°E
- Country: Turkey
- Province: Mardin
- District: Kızıltepe
- Population (2021): 372
- Time zone: UTC+3 (TRT)

Beşevler (Kurdish: Malan) is a neighbourhood in the municipality and district of Kızıltepe, Mardin Province in Turkey. The village is populated by Kurds of the Kîkan tribe and had a population of 372 in 2021.
