= Yazyurdu, Nusaybin =

Village in Mardin Province, Turkey

Yazyurdu
- Neighbourhood
- Location in Turkey
- Coordinates: 37.137°N 41.627°E
- Country: Turkey
- Province: Mardin
- District: Nusaybin
- Population (2021): 168
- Time zone: UTC+3 (TRT)

Yazyurdu (Kurdish: Qesra Belek) is a neighbourhood in the municipality and district of Nusaybin, Mardin Province in Turkey. The village is populated by Kurds of the Harunan tribe and had a population of 228 in 2021.
