= Yüksektepe, Kızıltepe =

Village in Mardin Province, Turkey

Yüksektepe
- Neighbourhood
- Location in Turkey
- Coordinates: 37.251°N 40.515°E
- Country: Turkey
- Province: Mardin
- District: Kızıltepe
- Population (2021): 111
- Time zone: UTC+3 (TRT)

Yüksektepe (Kurdish: Girelî) is a neighbourhood in the municipality and district of Kızıltepe, Mardin Province in Turkey. The village is populated by Kurds of the Erbanî tribe and had a population of 111 in 2021.
