= Aslanlı, Kızıltepe =

Village in Mardin Province, Turkey

Aslanlı
- Neighbourhood
- Location in Turkey
- Coordinates: 37.137°N 40.606°E
- Country: Turkey
- Province: Mardin
- District: Kızıltepe
- Population (2021): 119
- Time zone: UTC+3 (TRT)

Aslanlı (Kurdish: Gundikê Biro) is a neighbourhood in the municipality and district of Kızıltepe, Mardin Province in Turkey. The village is populated by Kurds of the Kîkan tribe and had a population of 119 in 2021.
