= Gözlüce, Kızıltepe =

Village in Mardin Province, Turkey

Gözlüce
- Neighbourhood
- Location in Turkey
- Coordinates: 37.073°N 40.524°E
- Country: Turkey
- Province: Mardin
- District: Kızıltepe
- Population (2021): 110
- Time zone: UTC+3 (TRT)

Gözlüce (Kurdish: Heramreş) is a neighbourhood in the municipality and district of Kızıltepe, Mardin Province in Turkey. The village is populated by Kurds of the Kîkan tribe and had a population of 110 in 2021.
