= Karabent, Kızıltepe =

Village in Mardin Province, Turkey

Karabent
- Neighbourhood
- Location in Turkey
- Coordinates: 37.071°N 40.158°E
- Country: Turkey
- Province: Mardin
- District: Kızıltepe
- Population (2021): 224
- Time zone: UTC+3 (TRT)

Karabent (Kurdish: Qerebendê) is a neighbourhood in the municipality and district of Kızıltepe, Mardin Province in Turkey. The village had a population of 224 in 2021.
