= Günebakan, Nusaybin =

Village in Mardin Province, Turkey

Günebakan
- Neighbourhood
- Location in Turkey
- Coordinates: 37.127°N 41.085°E
- Country: Turkey
- Province: Mardin
- District: Nusaybin
- Population (2021): 165
- Time zone: UTC+3 (TRT)

Günebakan (Kurdish: Zorava) is a neighbourhood in the municipality and district of Nusaybin, Mardin Province in Turkey. The village is populated by Kurds of the Bubilan tribe and had a population of 165 in 2021.
