= Belli, Kızıltepe =

Village in Mardin Province, Turkey

Belli
- Neighbourhood
- Location in Turkey
- Coordinates: 37.091°N 40.487°E
- Country: Turkey
- Province: Mardin
- District: Kızıltepe
- Population (2021): 110
- Time zone: UTC+3 (TRT)

Belli (Kurdish: Belê) is a neighbourhood in the municipality and district of Kızıltepe, Mardin Province in Turkey. The village is populated by Kurds of the Kîkan tribe and had a population of 110 in 2021.
