= Eymirli, Kızıltepe =

Village in Mardin Province, Turkey

Eymirli
- Neighbourhood
- Location in Turkey
- Coordinates: 37.170°N 40.687°E
- Country: Turkey
- Province: Mardin
- District: Kızıltepe
- Population (2021): 687
- Time zone: UTC+3 (TRT)

Eymirli (Kurdish: Tîbyat) is a neighbourhood in the municipality and district of Kızıltepe, Mardin Province in Turkey. The village is populated by Kurds of the Kîkan tribe and had a population of 933 in 2021.
