= Arakapı, Kızıltepe =

Village in Mardin Province, Turkey

Arakapı
- Neighbourhood
- Location in Turkey
- Coordinates: 37.280°N 40.539°E
- Country: Turkey
- Province: Mardin
- District: Kızıltepe
- Population (2021): 28
- Time zone: UTC+3 (TRT)

Arakapı is a neighbourhood in the municipality and district of Kızıltepe, Mardin Province in Turkey. The village is populated by Arabs and had a population of 28 in 2021.
