= Tıraşlı, Kızıltepe =

Village in Mardin Province, Turkey

Tıraşlı
- Neighbourhood
- Location in Turkey
- Coordinates: 37.108°N 40.308°E
- Country: Turkey
- Province: Mardin
- District: Kızıltepe
- Population (2021): 82
- Time zone: UTC+3 (TRT)

Tıraşlı (Kurdish: Teraşî) is a neighbourhood in the municipality and district of Kızıltepe, Mardin Province in Turkey. The village is populated by Kurds of the Xalecan tribe and had a population of 82 in 2021.
