= İkikuyu, Kızıltepe =

Village in Mardin Province, Turkey

İkikuyu
- Neighbourhood
- Location in Turkey
- Coordinates: 37.247°N 40.579°E
- Country: Turkey
- Province: Mardin
- District: Kızıltepe
- Population (2021): 71
- Time zone: UTC+3 (TRT)

İkikuyu (Kurdish: Girê Bîrê) is a neighbourhood in the municipality and district of Kızıltepe, Mardin Province in Turkey. The village had a population of 71 in 2021.
