= Çetinler, Kızıltepe =

Village in Mardin Province, Turkey

Çetinler
- Neighbourhood
- Location in Turkey
- Coordinates: 37.139°N 40.682°E
- Country: Turkey
- Province: Mardin
- District: Kızıltepe
- Population (2021): 273
- Time zone: UTC+3 (TRT)

Çetinler (Kurdish: Haramşedad) is a neighbourhood in the municipality and district of Kızıltepe, Mardin Province in Turkey. The village is populated by Kurds of the Kîkan tribe and had a population of 273 in 2021.
