= Hocaköy, Kızıltepe =

Village in Mardin Province, Turkey

Hocaköy
- Neighbourhood
- Location in Turkey
- Coordinates: 37.140°N 40.504°E
- Country: Turkey
- Province: Mardin
- District: Kızıltepe
- Population (2021): 1,915
- Time zone: UTC+3 (TRT)

Hocaköy (Kurdish: Evdilîmam) is a neighbourhood in the municipality and district of Kızıltepe, Mardin Province in Turkey. The village is populated by Kurds of the Xalecan tribe and had a population of 1,915 in 2021.
