= Saruhan, Kızıltepe =

Village in Mardin Province, Turkey

Saruhan
- Neighbourhood
- Location in Turkey
- Coordinates: 37.133°N 40.689°E
- Country: Turkey
- Province: Mardin
- District: Kızıltepe
- Population (2021): 46
- Time zone: UTC+3 (TRT)

Saruhan (Kurdish: Sarûxan) is a neighbourhood in the municipality and district of Kızıltepe, Mardin Province in Turkey. The village is populated by Kurds of the Kîkan tribe and had a population of 46 in 2021.
