= Örencik, Kızıltepe =

Village in Mardin Province, Turkey

Örencik
- Neighbourhood
- Location in Turkey
- Coordinates: 37.249°N 40.460°E
- Country: Turkey
- Province: Mardin
- District: Kızıltepe
- Population (2021): 324
- Time zone: UTC+3 (TRT)

Örencik (Kurdish: Xerab Kurka) is a neighbourhood in the municipality and district of Kızıltepe, Mardin Province in Turkey. The village is populated by Kurds of the Erbanî tribe and had a population of 324 in 2021.
