= Ayaz, Kızıltepe =

Village in Mardin Province, Turkey

Ayaz
- Neighbourhood
- Location in Turkey
- Coordinates: 37.298°N 40.629°E
- Country: Turkey
- Province: Mardin
- District: Kızıltepe
- Population (2021): 94
- Time zone: UTC+3 (TRT)

Ayaz (Kurdish: Çelebîya) is a neighbourhood in the municipality and district of Kızıltepe, Mardin Province in Turkey. The village is populated by Kurds of the Xurs tribe and had a population of 94 in 2021.
