= Tepeüstü, Nusaybin =

Village in Mardin Province, Turkey

Tepeüstü
- Neighbourhood
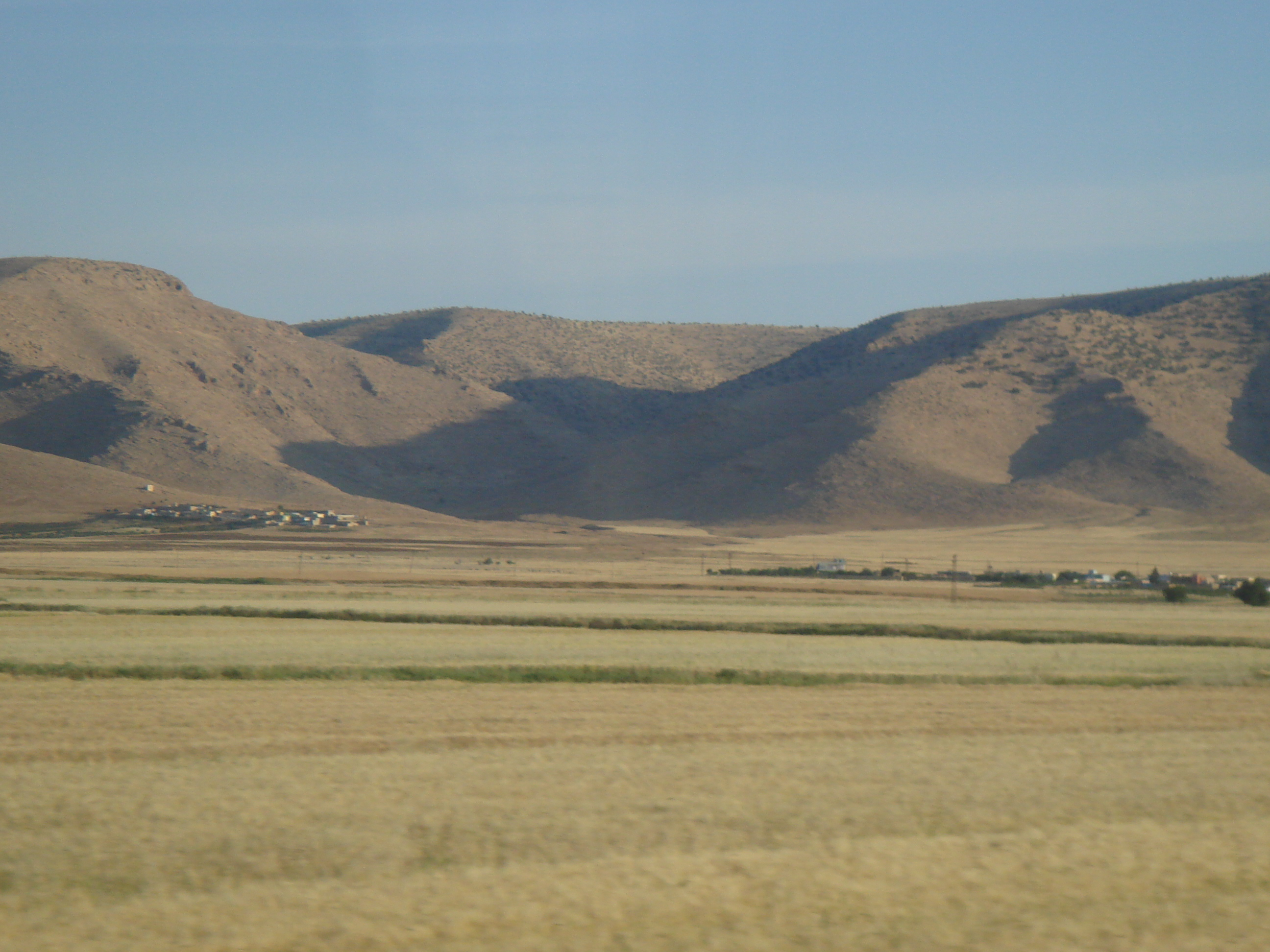
- Outskirts of the village

- Location within Turkey
- Coordinates: 37.113°N 41.382°E
- Country: Turkey
- Province: Mardin
- District: Nusaybin
- Population (2021): 1,269
- Time zone: UTC+3 (TRT)

Tepeüstü (Note: Also spelt as Tepeastu.) (Kurdish: Tilminar; Syriac: Tel-Manar) (Note: Alternatively transliterated as Tal Manār, Telminar, or Tel Manar.) is a neighbourhood in the municipality and district of Nusaybin, Mardin Province in Turkey. The village is populated by Kurds of the Kasikan tribe and had a population of 1,269 in 2021.

== History ==
Tel-Manar (today called Tepeüstü) was historically inhabited by Syriac Orthodox Christians. In the Syriac Orthodox patriarchal register of dues of 1870, it was recorded that the village had eleven households, who paid thirty dues, and it did not have a church or a priest. In 1914, it was populated by 150 Syriacs, as per the list presented to the Paris Peace Conference by the Assyro-Chaldean delegation. There were ten Syriac families in 1915. Amidst the Sayfo, the Syriacs took refuge at Mharkan, where they were then killed by Yusuf Hajo. By 1987, there were no remaining Syriacs.

== Bibliography ==
- Bcheiry, Iskandar (2009). The Syriac Orthodox Patriarchal Register of Dues of 1870: An Unpublished Historical Document from the Late Ottoman Period. Gorgias Press.
- Courtois, Sébastien de (2004). The Forgotten Genocide: Eastern Christians, The Last Arameans. Translated by Vincent Aurora. Gorgias Press.
- Gaunt, David (2006). Massacres, Resistance, Protectors: Muslim-Christian Relations in Eastern Anatolia during World War I. Gorgias Press.
- Jongerden, Joost; Verheij, Jelle, eds. (2012). Social Relations in Ottoman Diyarbekir, 1870-1915. Brill.
- Tan, Altan (2018). Turabidin'den Berriye'ye. Aşiretler - Dinler - Diller - Kültürler (in Turkish). Pak Ajans Yayincilik Turizm Ve Diş Ticaret Limited şirketi. ISBN 9789944360944.
