= Beşik, Kızıltepe =

Village in Mardin Province, Turkey

Beşik
- Neighbourhood
- Location in Turkey
- Coordinates: 36.970°N 40.268°E
- Country: Turkey
- Province: Mardin
- District: Kızıltepe
- Population (2021): 244
- Time zone: UTC+3 (TRT)

Beşik (Kurdish: Beşîk) is a neighbourhood in the municipality and district of Kızıltepe, Mardin Province in Turkey. The village is populated by Kurds of the Xalecan tribe and had a population of 244 in 2021.
