= Akarsu, Nusaybin =

Village in Mardin Province, Turkey

Akarsu
- Neighbourhood
- Location in Turkey
- Coordinates: 37.236°N 41.060°E
- Country: Turkey
- Province: Mardin
- District: Nusaybin
- Population (2022): 1,711
- Time zone: UTC+3 (TRT)

Akarsu (Kurdish: Stilîlê) is a neighbourhood of the municipality and district of Nusaybin, Mardin Province, Turkey. Its population is 1,711 (2022). Before the 2013 reorganisation, it was a town (belde). It is populated by Kurds of the Omerkan tribe.

== History ==
The village was formerly populated by Armenians.
