= Eskin, Kızıltepe =

Village in Mardin Province, Turkey

Eskin
- Neighbourhood
- Location in Turkey
- Coordinates: 37.215°N 40.677°E
- Country: Turkey
- Province: Mardin
- District: Kızıltepe
- Population (2021): 1,761
- Time zone: UTC+3 (TRT)

Eskin (Kurdish: Tilfeyzê) is a neighbourhood in the municipality and district of Kızıltepe, Mardin Province in Turkey. The village is populated by Arabs of the Tat tribe and by Kurds of the Barava tribe. It had a population of 1,761 in 2021.
