= Kayadibi, Nusaybin =

Village in Mardin Province, Turkey

Kayadibi
- Neighbourhood
- Location in Turkey
- Coordinates: 37.128°N 41.349°E
- Country: Turkey
- Province: Mardin
- District: Nusaybin
- Population (2021): 76
- Time zone: UTC+3 (TRT)

Kayadibi (Kurdish: Mendikan) is a neighbourhood in the municipality and district of Nusaybin, Mardin Province in Turkey. The village is populated by Kurds of the Çomeran tribe and had a population of 76 in 2021.
