= Soğanlı, Kızıltepe =

Village in Mardin Province, Turkey

Soğanlı
- Neighbourhood
- Location in Turkey
- Coordinates: 37.307°N 40.640°E
- Country: Turkey
- Province: Mardin
- District: Kızıltepe
- Population (2021): 155
- Time zone: UTC+3 (TRT)

Soğanlı (Kurdish: Xubas jor) is a neighbourhood in the municipality and district of Kızıltepe, Mardin Province in Turkey. The village is populated by Kurds of the Xurs tribe and had a population of 155 in 2021.
