= Çıplak, Kızıltepe =

Village in Mardin Province, Turkey

Çıplaklı
- Neighbourhood
- Location in Turkey
- Coordinates: 36.944°N 40.239°E
- Country: Turkey
- Province: Mardin
- District: Kızıltepe
- Population (2021): 611
- Time zone: UTC+3 (TRT)

Çıplaklı (Kurdish: Çîplax) is a neighbourhood in the municipality and district of Kızıltepe, Mardin Province in Turkey. The village is populated by Kurds of the Xalecan tribe and had a population of 611 in 2021.
