= Demirtepe, Nusaybin =

Village in Mardin Province, Turkey

Demirtepe
- Neighbourhood
- Location in Turkey
- Coordinates: 37.081°N 41.275°E
- Country: Turkey
- Province: Mardin
- District: Nusaybin
- Population (2021): 207
- Time zone: UTC+3 (TRT)

Demirtepe (Kurdish: Girhesin) is a neighbourhood in the municipality and district of Nusaybin, Mardin Province in Turkey. The village had a population of 207 in 2021.
