= Akziyaret, Kızıltepe =

Village in Mardin Province, Turkey

Akziyaret
- Neighbourhood
- Location in Turkey
- Coordinates: 37.200°N 40.508°E
- Country: Turkey
- Province: Mardin
- District: Kızıltepe
- Population (2021): 970
- Time zone: UTC+3 (TRT)

Akziyaret (Kurdish: Axziyaret) is a neighbourhood in the municipality and district of Kızıltepe, Mardin Province in Turkey. The village is populated by Kurds of the Erbanî Kurdish tribe and had a population of 970 in 2021.
