= Akçapınar, Kızıltepe =

Village in Mardin Province, Turkey

Akçapınar
- Neighbourhood
- Location in Turkey
- Coordinates: 37.281°N 40.427°E
- Country: Turkey
- Province: Mardin
- District: Kızıltepe
- Population (2021): 494
- Time zone: UTC+3 (TRT)

Akçapınar (Kurdish: Erban) is a neighbourhood in the municipality and district of Kızıltepe, Mardin Province in Turkey. The village is populated by Kurds of the Erbanî tribe and had a population of 494 in 2021.
