= Tarlabaşı, Kızıltepe =

Village in Mardin Province, Turkey

Tarlabaşı
- Neighbourhood
- Location in Turkey
- Coordinates: 37.021°N 40.302°E
- Country: Turkey
- Province: Mardin
- District: Kızıltepe
- Population (2022): 109
- Time zone: UTC+3 (TRT)

Tarlabaşı (Kurdish: Hîmran) is a neighbourhood in the municipality and district of Kızıltepe, Mardin Province in Turkey. The village is populated by Kurds of the Xalecan tribe. Its population is 109 (2022).
