= Taşlıca, Kızıltepe =

Village in Mardin Province, Turkey

Taşlıca
- Neighbourhood
- Location in Turkey
- Coordinates: 36.996°N 40.339°E
- Country: Turkey
- Province: Mardin
- District: Kızıltepe
- Population (2021): 939
- Time zone: UTC+3 (TRT)

Taşlıca (Kurdish: Xerabkort) is a neighbourhood in the municipality and district of Kızıltepe, Mardin Province in Turkey. The village is populated by Kurds of the Xalecan tribe and had a population of 939 in 2021.
