= Araköy, Kızıltepe =

Village in Mardin Province, Turkey

Araköy
- Neighbourhood
- Location in Turkey
- Coordinates: 37.205°N 40.530°E
- Country: Turkey
- Province: Mardin
- District: Kızıltepe
- Population (2021): 631
- Time zone: UTC+3 (TRT)

Araköy (Kurdish: Tilnişîr) is a neighbourhood in the municipality and district of Kızıltepe, Mardin Province in Turkey. The village is populated by Kurds of the Xalecan tribe and had a population of 320 in 2021.
