= Kızıltepe =

- District and municipality
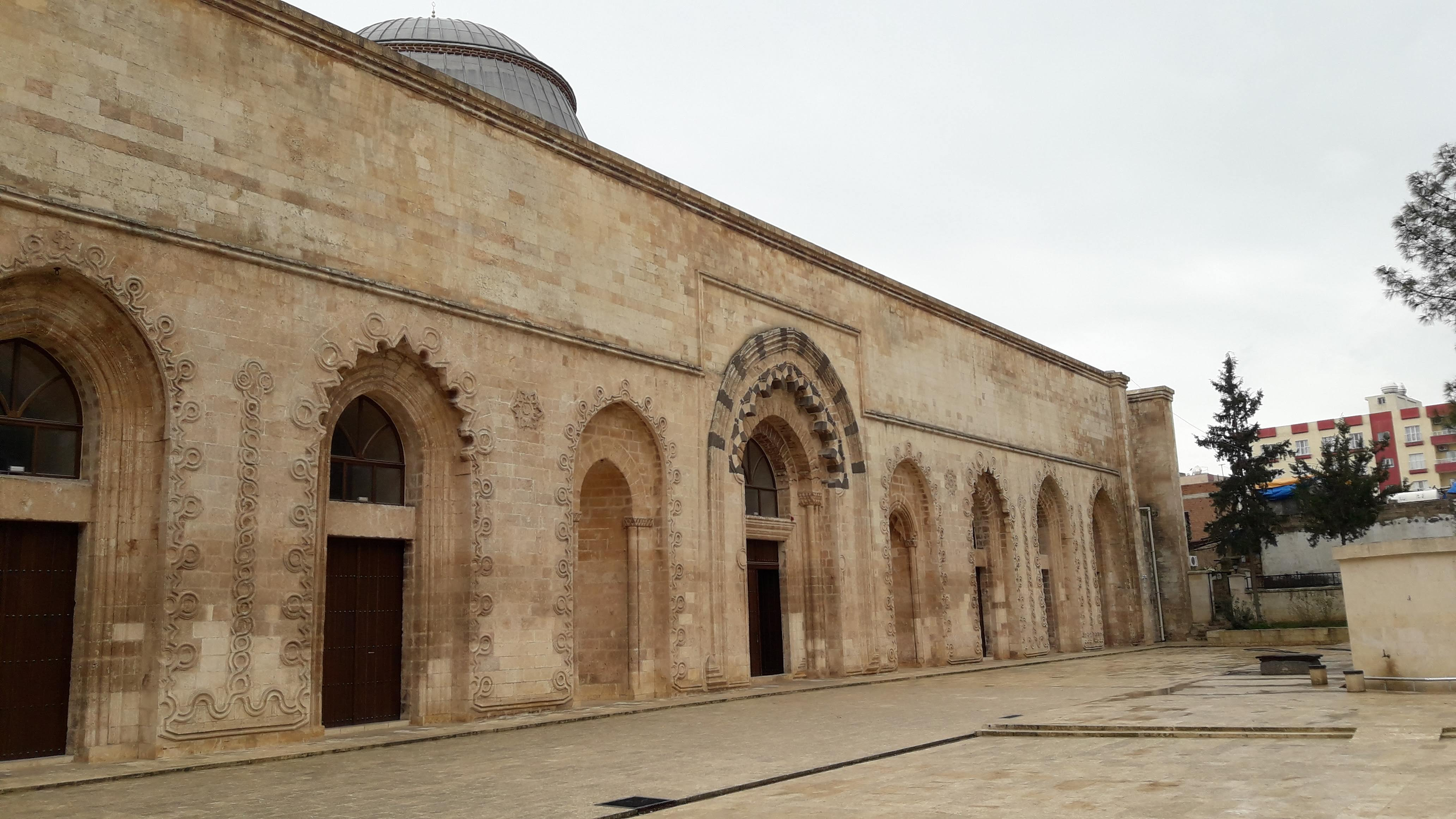

- Logo

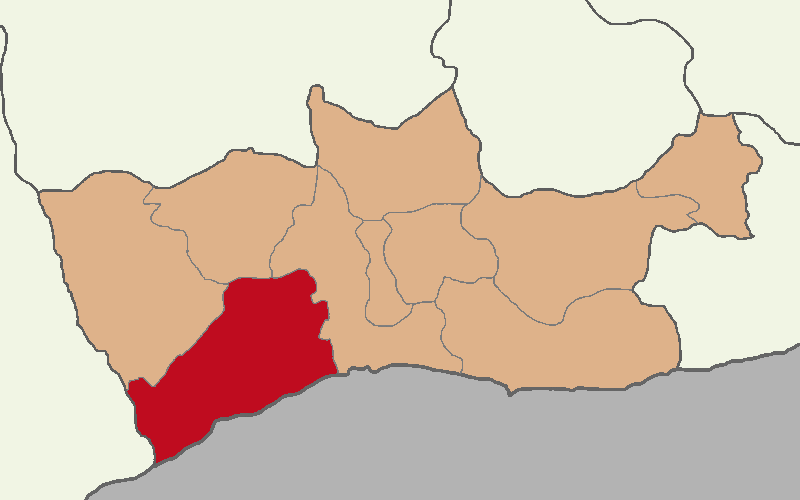
- Map showing Kızıltepe District in Mardin Province

- Location within Turkey
- Coordinates: 37°11′38″N 40°35′10″E
- Country: Turkey
- Province: Mardin
- Area: 1,236 km^{2} (477 sq mi)
- Elevation: 498 m (1,634 ft)
- Population (2022): 267,151
  - Density: 216.1/km^{2} (559.8/sq mi)
- Time zone: UTC+3 (TRT)
- Area code: 0482
- Website: www.kiziltepe.bel.tr

Kızıltepe (Turkish pronunciation: [kɯˈzɯɫtepe]; Kurdish: Qoser; Ottoman Turkish: تال ارمين, romanized: Tell Armen, lit. 'Armenian hill') is a municipality and district of Mardin Province, Turkey. Its area is 1,236 km^{2}, and its population is 267,151 (2022). It is mainly populated by Kurds of the Kîkan Kurdish tribe.

== Government ==
In the local elections of March 2019 Nilüfer Elik Yılmaz was elected as Mayor. But on 15 November 2019 she was dismissed and a trustee was appointed. The current District Governor is Hüseyin Cam, who was also appointed as the state appointed trustee.

== History ==
The town has a historic 13th century great Friday mosque built by the Artuqids.

On 1 July 1915, during the 1915 genocide in Diyarbekir, there was a massacre in the village where its Christian population, the Assyrians were murdered by militia and Kurds. About seventy women were raped in the church, then put to death. Men, women, and children were killed indiscriminately and many victims were decapitated. After the massacre, Kurdish women stabbed any survivors to death. Rafael de Nogales visited weeks later and found "corpses barely covered with heaps of stone from which emerged here and there a bloody tress or an arm or leg gnawed on by hyenas".

In the late 1980s there existed a refugee camp for Kurds who fled persecution by Saddam Hussein.

It was also the scene of clashes between protesting Kurds and Turkish riot police in 2006. In Kiziltepe have been imposed curfews in the past.

The highest temperature ever recorded in Kızıltepe is 49.6 °C (121.28 °F) on 25 July 2025.

== Composition ==
There are 183 neighbourhoods in Kızıltepe District. 10 of these (Atatürk, Bahçelievler, Cumhuriyet, Ersoylu, İpek, Koçhisar, Sanayi, Tepebaşı, Turgut Özal and Yeni Mahalle) formed the pre-2013 municipality of Kızıltepe.

- Akalın (Zorava Topal)
- Akça (Girgewr)
- Akçapınar (Erban)
- Akdoğan (Eradê)
- Akkoç (Xaçuk)
- Aktepe (Aqtepe)
- Aktulga (Elews)
- Akyazı (Herem Hedad)
- Akyüz (Ewên)
- Akziyaret (Axziyaret)
- Alakuş (Kermirara)
- Alemdar (Ewêna Mala Axê)
- Alipaşa
- Altıntoprak (Girbeşk)
- Arakapı
- Araköy (Tilnişîr)
- Arıklı (Mustafa Milik)
- Arıtepe (Girmozan)
- Aşağıazıklı (Tumika jêr)
- Aslanlı (Gundikê Biro)
- Ataköy (Akrebî)
- Atatürk
- Atmaca (Xirxir)
- Ayaz (Çelebîya)
- Bağrıbütün (Demîra)
- Bahçelievler
- Barış (Bariş)
- Başak (Sinara)
- Başdeğirmen (Amrudî)
- Bektaş (Bektaşî)
- Belli (Belê)
- Beşevler (Malan)
- Beşik (Beşîk)
- Bozhüyük (Til Edes)
- Büyükayrık (Meşkoka mezin)
- Büyükboğaziye (Boxaziya biçûk)
- Büyükdere (Bûnasê)
- Büyüktepe (Korî)
- Çağıl (Meşkok)
- Çakır (Girbêl)
- Çamlıca (Gundik)
- Çamlıdere (Gundikê Hecî Silêman)
- Çanaklı (Duhêl)
- Cantaşı (Xerabreş)
- Çatalca (Mehêna)
- Çaybaşı (Biêcî)
- Çetinkaya (Şikefta)
- Çetinler (Haramşedad)
- Çimenli (Mergê)
- Çınarcık (Hemo Reşik)
- Çıplak (Çîplax)
- Çitlibağ (Tilqerê)
- Cumhuriyet
- Damlalı (Dokan)
- Demet (Gola Darê)
- Demirci (Hidêdî)
- Demirkapı (Merşo)
- Demirler (Gundê Fereco)
- Dikmen (Hêşerî)
- Doğanlı (Mîlanê)
- Dörtyol (Tiltîn)
- Doyuran (Teltaim)
- Düğürk (Dugurkê)
- Dunaysır
- Dura (Tileckê)
- Ekinlik (Mezrê)
- Elbeyli (Tilşirez)
- Elmalı (Tifahî, Tofan)
- Erdem (Meşkina)
- Erikli (Elimişmiş)
- Eroğlu (Xanika Herzem)
- Ersoylu
- Esenli (Girmelêva)
- Eskin (Tilfeyzê)
- Eşme (Mizqeyntar)
- Eymirli (Tîbyat)
- Fındıktepe (Gundê Hecî Elî)
- Fırat
- Göllü (Golî)
- Gözlüce (Heramreş)
- Güçlü (Mecbur)
- Gümüşdere (Şêxê Rêş)
- Güneştepe (Xerabê Şemsan)
- Güngören (Cioşî)
- Günlüce (Kanîspî)
- Gürmeşe (Badîna)
- Hacıhasan (Hecî Hesen)
- Hacıyusuf (Hecî Yûsif)
- Hakverdi (Melelîk)
- Halkalı (Kilêbin)
- Harmandüzü (Mewîjo)
- Haznedar (Xaznedar)
- Hocaköy (Evdilîmam)
- İkikuyu (Girê Bîrê)
- İkizler (Îkîzler)
- Ilıcak (Rasilhimam)
- İnandı (Kisxo)
- İpek
- Işıklar (Birahîmiyê)
- Işıkören (Hêliyê)
- Kahraman (Qehreman)
- Kalaycık (Qelaçiye)
- Karabent (Qerebendê)
- Karakulak (Qerequlax)
- Karakuyu (Qereqo)
- Karaman
- Kaşıklı (Çiza Viza)
- Katarlı (Ebuqiter)
- Kayapınar (Tahtoka Hecî Seîd)
- Kaynarca (Tolik)
- Kengerli (Kerengo)
- Kılduman (Quldûman)
- Kilimli (Tahtok)
- Kırkkuyu (Çel Bîra)
- Kocalar (Hecî Feris)
- Koçhisar
- Koçlu (Kefertût)
- Konuklu (Cûan)
- Köprübaşı (Cirnikê)
- Körsu (Kor Uso)
- Küçükayrık (Meşkoka biçûk)
- Küçükboğaziye (Boxaziya biçûk)
- Küplüce (Şemika)
- Mevlana
- Mezopotamya
- Odaköy (Oda)
- Ofis (Ofîs)
- Örencik (Xerab Kurka)
- Ortaköy (Girik)
- Otluk (Cûmik)
- Rıhani (Rihanî)
- Şahkulubey
- Sanayi
- Sancarlı (Kurrê)
- Sandıklı (Sindoqî)
- Sarıca (Xirbê Belek)
- Saruhan (Sarûxan)
- Selahattin Eyyubi
- Şenyurt (Dirbêsî)
- Sevimli (Melho)
- Soğanlı (Xubas jor)
- Sürekli (Diêmê)
- Tanrıverdi (Şemoka)
- Tarlabaşı (Hîmran)
- Taşlıca (Xerabkort)
- Tatlıca (Heyto)
- Tepebaşı
- Timurçiftliği (Çeltûk)
- Tıraşlı (Teraşî)
- Tosunlu (Dikê)
- Turgut Özal
- Tuzlaköy (Bavina)
- Tuzluca (Eledizkê)
- Üçevler (Gundik)
- Ulaşlı (Dixê)
- Ülkerköy (Dêrika Hesê Ûso)
- Uluköy (Gundê Uzeyr)
- Uzunkaya (Bilokî)
- Yalınkılıç (Xanika Silo)
- Yamaç (Dubirka)
- Yamanlar (Kanîsor)
- Yarımca (Yarimcê)
- Yaşarköy (Pirmîr)
- Yayıklı (Cirdo'i)
- Yaylım (Şefelor)
- Yedikardeş (Haftexwan)
- Yeni Mahalle
- Yenikent
- Yeşilköy (Xanika)
- Yeşiller (Gundik)
- Yolaldı (Zorava)
- Yoldere (Xerabilmê)
- Yolüstü (Rêçikê)
- Yoncalı (Dukuk)
- Yüceli (Xursa navê)
- Yukarıazıklı (Tumika jor)
- Yüksektepe (Girelî)
- Yumrucuk (Kaynûn)
- Yumrutaş (Qûça Guran)
- Yurtderi (Aferê)
- Yurtözü (Cabo, Çabol)
- Zergan
- Ziyaret (Şêx Taceddin)

== Notable people ==
- Metin Gürak (1960-), 31st chief of the Turkish General Staff
- Selma Irmak (1971–), politician
- Ferit Gümüş (1981-), wheelchair basketball player and Paralympian
- Ahmet Aras (1987-), footballer
- Okan Alkan (1992-), footballer
- Beritan Güneş Altın (1995-), psychologist and politician
- Yılmaz Basravi (2000-), footballer

== Bibliography ==
- Tan, Altan (2018), Turabidin'den Berriye'ye. Aşiretler - Dinler - Diller - Kültürler (in Turkish), Pak Ajans Yayincilik Turizm Ve Diş Ticaret Limited şirketi, ISBN 9789944360944
