= Küplüce, Kızıltepe =

Village in Mardin Province, Turkey

Küplüce
- Neighbourhood
- Location within Turkey
- Coordinates: 37.063°N 40.283°E
- Country: Turkey
- Province: Mardin
- District: Kızıltepe
- Population (2021): 447
- Time zone: UTC+3 (TRT)

Küplüce (Kurdish: Şemika) is a neighbourhood in the municipality and district of Kızıltepe, Mardin Province in Turkey. The village is populated by Kurds of the Xalecan tribe and had a population of 447 in 2021.
