= Haznedar, Kızıltepe =

Village in Mardin Province, Turkey

Haznedar
- Neighbourhood
- Location in Turkey
- Coordinates: 37.057°N 40.555°E
- Country: Turkey
- Province: Mardin
- District: Kızıltepe
- Population (2021): 313
- Time zone: UTC+3 (TRT)

Haznedar (Kurdish: Xaznedar) is a neighbourhood in the municipality and district of Kızıltepe, Mardin Province in Turkey. The village is populated by Kurds of the Kîkan tribe and had a population of 313 in 2021.
