= Aktulga, Kızıltepe =

Village in Mardin Province, Turkey

Aktulga
- Neighbourhood
- Location in Turkey
- Coordinates: 37.236°N 40.470°E
- Country: Turkey
- Province: Mardin
- District: Kızıltepe
- Population (2021): 140
- Time zone: UTC+3 (TRT)

Aktulga (Kurdish: Elews) is a neighbourhood in the municipality and district of Kızıltepe, Mardin Province in Turkey. The village is populated by Kurds of the Erbanî tribe and had a population of 140 in 2021.
