= Akalın, Kızıltepe =

Village in Mardin Province, Turkey

Akalın
- Neighbourhood
- Location in Turkey
- Coordinates: 37.152°N 40.616°E
- Country: Turkey
- Province: Mardin
- District: Kızıltepe
- Population (2021): 426
- Time zone: UTC+3 (TRT)

Akalın (Kurdish: Zorava Topal) is a neighbourhood in the municipality and district of Kızıltepe, Mardin Province in Turkey. The village is populated by Kurds of the Kîkan tribe and had a population of 426 in 2021.
