= Yüceli, Kızıltepe =

Village in Mardin Province, Turkey

Yüceli
- Neighbourhood
- Location in Turkey
- Coordinates: 37.294°N 40.634°E
- Country: Turkey
- Province: Mardin
- District: Kızıltepe
- Population (2022): 1,135
- Time zone: UTC+3 (TRT)

Yüceli (Kurdish: Xursa navê) is a neighbourhood of the municipality and district of Kızıltepe, Mardin Province, Turkey. Its population is 1,135 (2022). Before the 2013 reorganisation, it was a town (belde). It is predominantly populated by Kurds of the Xurs tribe. Arabs constitute one quarter of the population.
