= Akyüz, Kızıltepe =

Village in Mardin Province, Turkey

Akyüz
- Neighbourhood
- Location in Turkey
- Coordinates: 37.118°N 40.549°E
- Country: Turkey
- Province: Mardin
- District: Kızıltepe
- Population (2021): 137
- Time zone: UTC+3 (TRT)

Akyüz (Kurdish: Ewên) is a neighbourhood in the municipality and district of Kızıltepe, Mardin Province in Turkey. The village is populated by Kurds of the Kîkan tribe and had a population of 137 in 2021.
