= Çınarcık, Kızıltepe =

Village in Mardin Province, Turkey

Çınarcık
- Neighbourhood
- Location in Turkey
- Coordinates: 37.214°N 40.609°E
- Country: Turkey
- Province: Mardin
- District: Kızıltepe
- Population (2021): 154
- Time zone: UTC+3 (TRT)

Çınarcık (Kurdish: Hemo Reşik) is a neighbourhood in the municipality and district of Kızıltepe, Mardin Province in Turkey. The village is populated by Kurds of the Kîkan tribe and had a population of 154 in 2021.
