= Eskiyol, Nusaybin =

Village in Mardin Province, Turkey

Eskiyol
- Neighbourhood
- Location in Turkey
- Coordinates: 37.104°N 41.118°E
- Country: Turkey
- Province: Mardin
- District: Nusaybin
- Population (2021): 91
- Time zone: UTC+3 (TRT)

Eskiyol (Kurdish: Cuva) is a neighbourhood in the municipality and district of Nusaybin, Mardin Province in Turkey. The village is populated by Kurds of the Bubilan tribe and had a population of 91 in 2021.
