= Esenli, Kızıltepe =

Village in Mardin Province, Turkey

Esenli
- Neighbourhood
- Location in Turkey
- Coordinates: 37.222°N 40.557°E
- Country: Turkey
- Province: Mardin
- District: Kızıltepe
- Population (2021): 306
- Time zone: UTC+3 (TRT)

Esenli (Kurdish: Girmelêva) is a neighbourhood in the municipality and district of Kızıltepe, Mardin Province in Turkey. The village had a population of 306 in 2021.
