= Demirci, Kızıltepe =

Village in Mardin Province, Turkey

Demirci
- Neighbourhood
- Location in Turkey
- Coordinates: 37.157°N 40.453°E
- Country: Turkey
- Province: Mardin
- District: Kızıltepe
- Population (2021): 227
- Time zone: UTC+3 (TRT)

Demirci (Kurdish: Hidêdî) is a neighbourhood in the municipality and district of Kızıltepe, Mardin Province in Turkey. The village is populated by Kurds of the Xalecan tribe and had a population of 227 in 2021.
