= Uluköy, Kızıltepe =

Village in Mardin Province, Turkey

Uluköy
- Neighbourhood
- Location in Turkey
- Coordinates: 37.301°N 40.616°E
- Country: Turkey
- Province: Mardin
- District: Kızıltepe
- Population (2021): 297
- Time zone: UTC+3 (TRT)

Uluköy (Kurdish: Gundê Uzeyr) is a neighbourhood in the municipality and district of Kızıltepe, Mardin Province, in Turkey. The village is populated by Kurds of the Xurs tribe and by Kurdophone Mhallami. It had population of 297 in 2021.
