= Dikmen, Kızıltepe =

Village in Mardin Province, Turkey

Dikmen
- Neighbourhood
- Location in Turkey
- Coordinates: 37.088°N 40.415°E
- Country: Turkey
- Province: Mardin
- District: Kızıltepe
- Population (2022): 3,074
- Time zone: UTC+3 (TRT)

Dikmen (Kurdish: Hêşerî) is a neighbourhood of the municipality and district of Kızıltepe, Mardin Province, Turkey.

Before the 2013 reorganisation, it was a town (belde). It is populated by Kurds of the Xalecan tribe.

Its population is 3,074 (2022).
