= Tanrıverdi, Kızıltepe =

Village in Mardin Province, Turkey

Tanrıverdi
- Neighbourhood
- Location in Turkey
- Coordinates: 37.093°N 40.585°E
- Country: Turkey
- Province: Mardin
- District: Kızıltepe
- Population (2021): 210
- Time zone: UTC+3 (TRT)

Tanrıverdi (Kurdish: Şemoka) is a neighbourhood in the municipality and district of Kızıltepe, Mardin Province in Turkey. The village is populated by Kurds of the Kîkan tribe and had a population of 210 in 2021.
