= Küçükköy =

Küçükköy (Turkish: "small village") is the name of a number of neighborhoods and villages in Turkey:

- Küçükköy, Ardeşen
- Küçükköy, Arhavi
- Küçükköy, Artuklu
- Küçükköy, Ayvalık
- Küçükköy, Borçka
- Küçükköy, Gaziosmanpaşa district, Istanbul
- Küçükköy, Korkuteli
