= Çağlar =

Çağlar is a Turkish given name for males (mostly) and females and a surname. It may refer to:

- Çağlar (name), Turkish given name and surname

== Places ==
- Çağlar, Artuklu, a neighbourhood in Mardin Province, Turkey
- Çağlar, Elâzığ, a village in Elazığ Province, Turkey
- Çağlar, Devrek, a village in Zonguldak Province, Turkey
- Çağlar, Nusaybin, a neighbourhood in Mardin Province, Turkey
