= Düzlük, Artuklu =

Village in Mardin Province, Turkey

Düzlük
- Neighbourhood
- Location in Turkey
- Coordinates: 37.128°N 40.984°E
- Country: Turkey
- Province: Mardin
- District: Artuklu
- Population (2021): 86
- Time zone: UTC+3 (TRT)

Düzlük (Kurdish: Domiza) is a neighbourhood in the municipality and district of Artuklu, Mardin Province in Turkey. The village had a population of 86 in 2021.
