= Çatak, Artuklu =

Village in Mardin Province, Turkey

Çatak
- Neighbourhood
- Location in Turkey
- Coordinates: 37.185°N 40.777°E
- Country: Turkey
- Province: Mardin
- District: Artuklu
- Population (2021): 617
- Time zone: UTC+3 (TRT)

Çatak is a neighbourhood in the municipality and district of Artuklu, Mardin Province in Turkey. The village is populated by Kurds of the Hasana tribe and had a population of 617 in 2021.
