= Acar, Artuklu =

Village in Mardin Province, Turkey

Acar
- Neighbourhood
- Location in Turkey
- Coordinates: 37.301°N 40.707°E
- Country: Turkey
- Province: Mardin
- District: Artuklu
- Population (2021): 172
- Time zone: UTC+3 (TRT)

Acar (Kurdish: Diyarê Dêrê) is a neighbourhood in the municipality and district of Artuklu, Mardin Province in Turkey. The village had a population of 172 in 2021.
