= Çiftlikköy, Artuklu =

Village in Mardin Province, Turkey

Çiftlikköy
- Neighbourhood
- Location in Turkey
- Coordinates: 37.286°N 40.728°E
- Country: Turkey
- Province: Mardin
- District: Artuklu
- Population (2021): 311
- Time zone: UTC+3 (TRT)

Çiftlikköy (Syriac: Dayr Eliyyō) (Note: Also known as Dayr Heliyyā, Derelya, Der-Eliya, Cheftelik, Chiftlik, Çiftlik, Ğaftalik, or Tjeftelek.) is a neighbourhood in the municipality and district of Artuklu, Mardin Province in Turkey. The village had a population of 311 in 2021.

== History ==
Dayr Eliyyō (today called Çiftlikköy) was historically inhabited by Syriac Orthodox Christians. The Syriac Orthodox Church of Saint Theodore at Dayr Eliyyō is believed to have been constructed in the 5th century. The Monastery of Mar Iliyya (Elijah) the Prophet was renovated by Yuhanna, metropolitan of Mardin, in the mid-12th century. It was still inhabited by monks in the 16th century. In 1582–1589, 15 deacons and 2 priests were ordained for the Church of Morī Eliyyō at Dayr Eliyyō.

In the Syriac Orthodox patriarchal register of dues of 1870, it was recorded that the village had 7 households, who did not pay any dues, and did not have a priest. It was located in Mardin merkez kaza (central district) in the Mardin sanjak in the Diyarbekir vilayet in c. 1900. It was populated by 200 Syriacs in 1914, according to the list presented to the Paris Peace Conference by the Assyro-Chaldean delegation. There were 30 Christian families. It is unknown what happened to the village amidst the Sayfo, however, all of the neighbouring Christian villagers were destroyed in June 1915. There were 2 Christian families at the village in 1999.

== Bibliography ==
- Barsoum, Aphrem (2008). History of the Za'faran Monastery. Translated by Matti Moosa. Gorgias Press.
- Bcheiry, Iskandar (2009). The Syriac Orthodox Patriarchal Register of Dues of 1870: An Unpublished Historical Document from the Late Ottoman Period. Gorgias Press.
- Bcheiry, Iskandar (2010). A List of Syriac Orthodox Ecclesiastic Ordinations from the Sixteenth and Seventeenth Century: The Syriac Manuscript of Hunt 444 (Syr 68 in Bodleian Library, Oxford). Gorgias Press.
- Courtois, Sébastien de (2013). "Tur Abdin : Réflexions sur l'état présent descommunautés syriaques du Sud-Est de la Turquie, mémoire, exils, retours". Cahier du Gremmamo (in French). 21: 113–150.
- Gaunt, David (2006). Massacres, Resistance, Protectors: Muslim-Christian Relations in Eastern Anatolia during World War I. Gorgias Press.
- Hollerweger, Hans; Palmer, Andrew (1999). Turabdin: Living Cultural Heritage (in English, German, and Turkish) (2nd ed.). Friends of Tur Abdin.
- Jongerden, Joost; Verheij, Jelle, eds. (2012). Social Relations in Ottoman Diyarbekir, 1870-1915. Brill.
