= Avcılar, Artuklu =

Village in Mardin Province, Turkey

Avcılar
- Neighbourhood
- Location in Turkey
- Coordinates: 37.297°N 40.692°E
- Country: Turkey
- Province: Mardin
- District: Artuklu
- Population (2021): 243
- Time zone: UTC+3 (TRT)

Avcılar (Kurdish: Mûsîkan) is a neighbourhood in the municipality and district of Artuklu, Mardin Province in Turkey. The village had a population of 243 in 2021.

== Notable people ==
- Hozan Brader
