= Yukarıaydınlı, Artuklu =

Village in Mardin Province, Turkey

Yukarıaydınlı
- Neighbourhood
- Location in Turkey
- Coordinates: 37.159°N 40.900°E
- Country: Turkey
- Province: Mardin
- District: Artuklu
- Population (2021): 422
- Time zone: UTC+3 (TRT)

Yukarıaydınlı (Kurdish: Qeraşîka jor) is a neighbourhood in the municipality and district of Artuklu, Mardin Province in Turkey. The village is populated by Kurds of the Dakoran and Qelenderan tribes and had a population of 422 in 2021.
