= Kumlu, Artuklu =

Village in Mardin Province, Turkey

Kumlu
- Neighbourhood
- Location in Turkey
- Coordinates: 37.172°N 40.736°E
- Country: Turkey
- Province: Mardin
- District: Artuklu
- Population (2021): 2,344
- Time zone: UTC+3 (TRT)

Kumlu is a neighbourhood in the municipality and district of Artuklu, Mardin Province in Turkey. The village is populated by Arabs of the Tat tribe and by Kurds from Bahdinan. It had a population of 2,344 in 2021.
