= Tozan, Artuklu =

Village in Mardin Province, Turkey

Tozan
- Neighbourhood
- Location in Turkey
- Coordinates: 37.125°N 40.73°E
- Country: Turkey
- Province: Mardin
- District: Artuklu
- Population (2021): 193
- Time zone: UTC+3 (TRT)

Tozan (Kurdish: Xubêr) is a neighbourhood in the municipality and district of Artuklu, Mardin Province in Turkey. The village is populated by Kurds of the Mîlan tribe. It had a population of 193 in 2021.
