= Alımlı, Artuklu =

Village in Mardin Province, Turkey

Alımlı
- Neighbourhood
- Location in Turkey
- Coordinates: 37.287°N 40.809°E
- Country: Turkey
- Province: Mardin
- District: Artuklu
- Population (2021): 126
- Time zone: UTC+3 (TRT)

Alımlı (Kurdish: Bîlalî) is a neighbourhood in the municipality and district of Artuklu, Mardin Province in Turkey. The village is populated by Kurds and had a population of 126 in 2021.
