= Dibektaş, Artuklu =

Village in Mardin Province, Turkey

Dibektaş
- Neighbourhood
- Location in Turkey
- Coordinates: 37.129°N 40.839°E
- Country: Turkey
- Province: Mardin
- District: Artuklu
- Population (2021): 52
- Time zone: UTC+3 (TRT)

Dibektaş (Kurdish: Dîbek) is a neighbourhood in the municipality and district of Artuklu, Mardin Province in Turkey. The village is populated by Kurds of the Dakoran tribe and had a population of 52 in 2021.
