= Yüce, Artuklu =

Village in Mardin Province, Turkey

Yüce
- Neighbourhood
- Location in Turkey
- Coordinates: 37.448°N 40.617°E
- Country: Turkey
- Province: Mardin
- District: Artuklu
- Population (2021): 766
- Time zone: UTC+3 (TRT)

Yüce (Kurdish: Şêxan) is a neighbourhood in the municipality and district of Artuklu, Mardin Province in Turkey. The village had a population of 766 in 2021.
