= Eroğlu, Artuklu =

Village in Mardin Province, Turkey

Eroğlu
- Neighbourhood
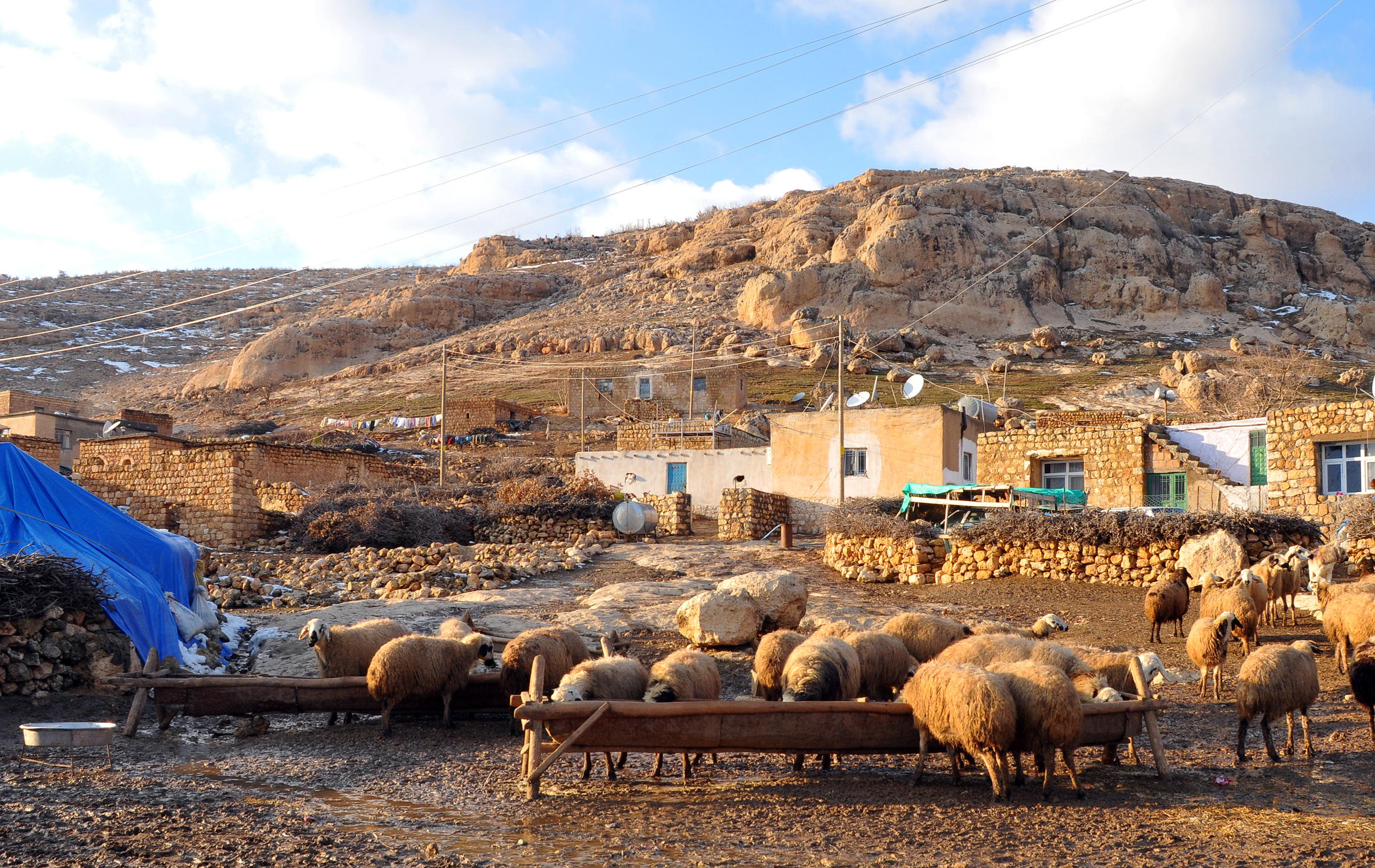

- Location within Turkey
- Coordinates: 37.404°N 40.605°E
- Country: Turkey
- Province: Mardin
- District: Artuklu
- Population (2021): 260
- Time zone: UTC+3 (TRT)

Eroğlu (Kurdish: Hindûla) is a neighbourhood in the municipality and district of Artuklu, Mardin Province in Turkey. The village is populated by Kurds of the Surgucu tribe and had a population of 260 in 2021.
