= Sulak, Artuklu =

Village in Mardin Province, Turkey

Sulak
- Neighbourhood
- Location in Turkey
- Coordinates: 37.128°N 41.051°E
- Country: Turkey
- Province: Mardin
- District: Artuklu
- Population (2021): 294
- Time zone: UTC+3 (TRT)

Sulak (Kurdish: Sarincê) is a neighbourhood in the municipality and district of Artuklu, Mardin Province in Turkey. The village is populated by Kurds of the Bubilan tribe and had a population of 294 in 2021.
