= Göllü, Artuklu =

Village in Mardin Province, Turkey

Göllü
- Neighbourhood
- Location in Turkey
- Coordinates: 37.251°N 40.716°E
- Country: Turkey
- Province: Mardin
- District: Artuklu
- Population (2021): 843
- Time zone: UTC+3 (TRT)

Göllü (Syriac: Qsor; Kurdish: Goliyê) is a neighbourhood in the municipality and district of Artuklu, Mardin Province in Turkey. It is populated by Arabs of the Tat tribe, Assyrians and Kurds and had a population of 843 in 2021.
