= Çalışlı, Artuklu =

Village in Mardin Province, Turkey

Çalışlı
- Neighbourhood
- Location in Turkey
- Coordinates: 37.161°N 40.771°E
- Country: Turkey
- Province: Mardin
- District: Artuklu
- Population (2021): 864
- Time zone: UTC+3 (TRT)

Çalışlı (Kurdish: Şeqlan) is a neighbourhood in the municipality and district of Artuklu, Mardin Province in Turkey. The village is populated by Arabs of the Tat tribe and by Kurds of the Omerkan tribe. It had a population of 864 in 2021.
