= Hüyüklü, Artuklu =

Village in Mardin Province, Turkey

Hüyüklü
- Neighbourhood
- Location in Turkey
- Coordinates: 37.181°N 40.821°E
- Country: Turkey
- Province: Mardin
- District: Artuklu
- Population (2021): 348
- Time zone: UTC+3 (TRT)

Hüyüklü (Kurdish: Girmasek) is a neighbourhood in the municipality and district of Artuklu, Mardin Province in Turkey. The village is populated by Kurds of the Qelenderan Kurdish tribe and had a population of 348 in 2021.
