= Yardere, Artuklu =

Village in Mardin Province, Turkey

Yardere
- Neighbourhood
- Location in Turkey
- Coordinates: 37.230°N 40.978°E
- Country: Turkey
- Province: Mardin
- District: Artuklu
- Population (2021): 186
- Time zone: UTC+3 (TRT)

Yardere (Kurdish: Qurdîsê) is a neighbourhood in the municipality and district of Artuklu, Mardin Province in Turkey. The village is populated by Kurds of the Omerkan tribe and had a population of 186 in 2021.
