= Kuyulu, Artuklu =

Village in Mardin Province, Turkey

Kuyulu
- Neighbourhood
- Location within Turkey
- Coordinates: 37.159°N 40.798°E
- Country: Turkey
- Province: Mardin
- District: Artuklu
- Population (2021): 616
- Time zone: UTC+3 (TRT)

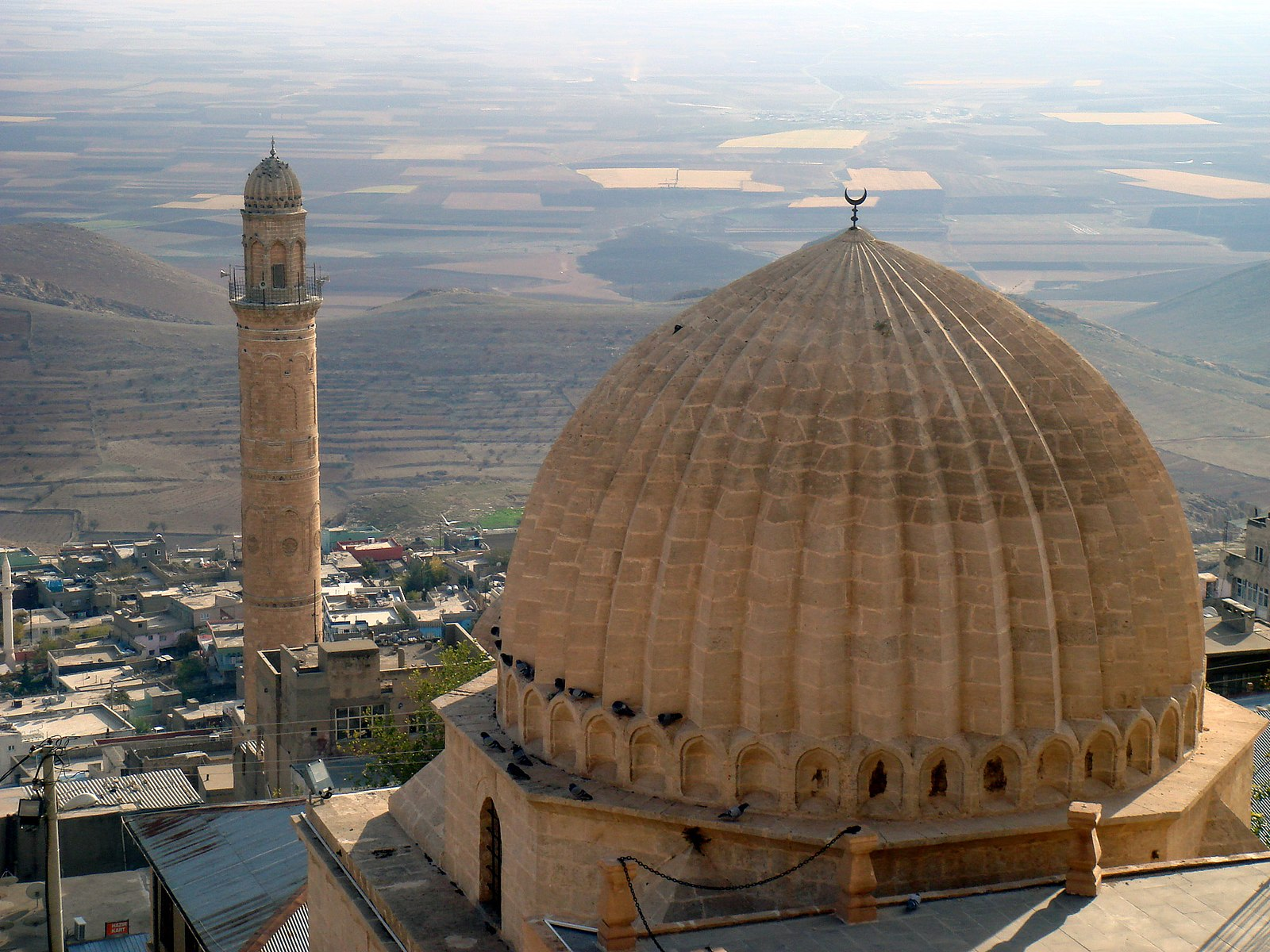

Kuyulu is a neighbourhood in the municipality and district of Artuklu, Mardin Province in Turkey. The village is populated by Arabs of the Tat tribe and had a population of 616 in 2021.
