= Boztepe, Artuklu =

Village in Mardin Province, Turkey

Boztepe
- Neighbourhood
- Location in Turkey
- Coordinates: 37.183°N 40.716°E
- Country: Turkey
- Province: Mardin
- District: Artuklu
- Population (2021): 762
- Time zone: UTC+3 (TRT)

Boztepe or Bozkatır is a neighbourhood in the municipality and district of Artuklu, Mardin Province in Turkey. The village is populated by Arabs of the Tat tribe and had a population of 762 in 2021.
