= Buğday, Artuklu =

Village in Mardin Province, Turkey

Buğday
- Neighbourhood
- Location in Turkey
- Coordinates: 37.170°N 40.814°E
- Country: Turkey
- Province: Mardin
- District: Artuklu
- Population (2021): 568
- Time zone: UTC+3 (TRT)

Buğday (Kurdish: Bixêdîk) is a neighbourhood in the municipality and district of Artuklu, Mardin Province in Turkey. The village is populated by Kurds of the Qelenderan tribe and had a population of 568 in 2021.
