= Aran, Artuklu =

Village in Mardin Province, Turkey

Aran
- Neighbourhood
- Location in Turkey
- Coordinates: 37.448°N 40.748°E
- Country: Turkey
- Province: Mardin
- District: Artuklu
- Population (2021): 791
- Time zone: UTC+3 (TRT)

Aran (Kurdish: Zonê) is a neighbourhood in the municipality and district of Artuklu, Mardin Province in Turkey. The village is populated by Kurds of the Surgucu tribe and had a population of 791 in 2021.
