= Bağlıca, Artuklu =

Village in Mardin Province, Turkey

Bağlıca
- Neighbourhood
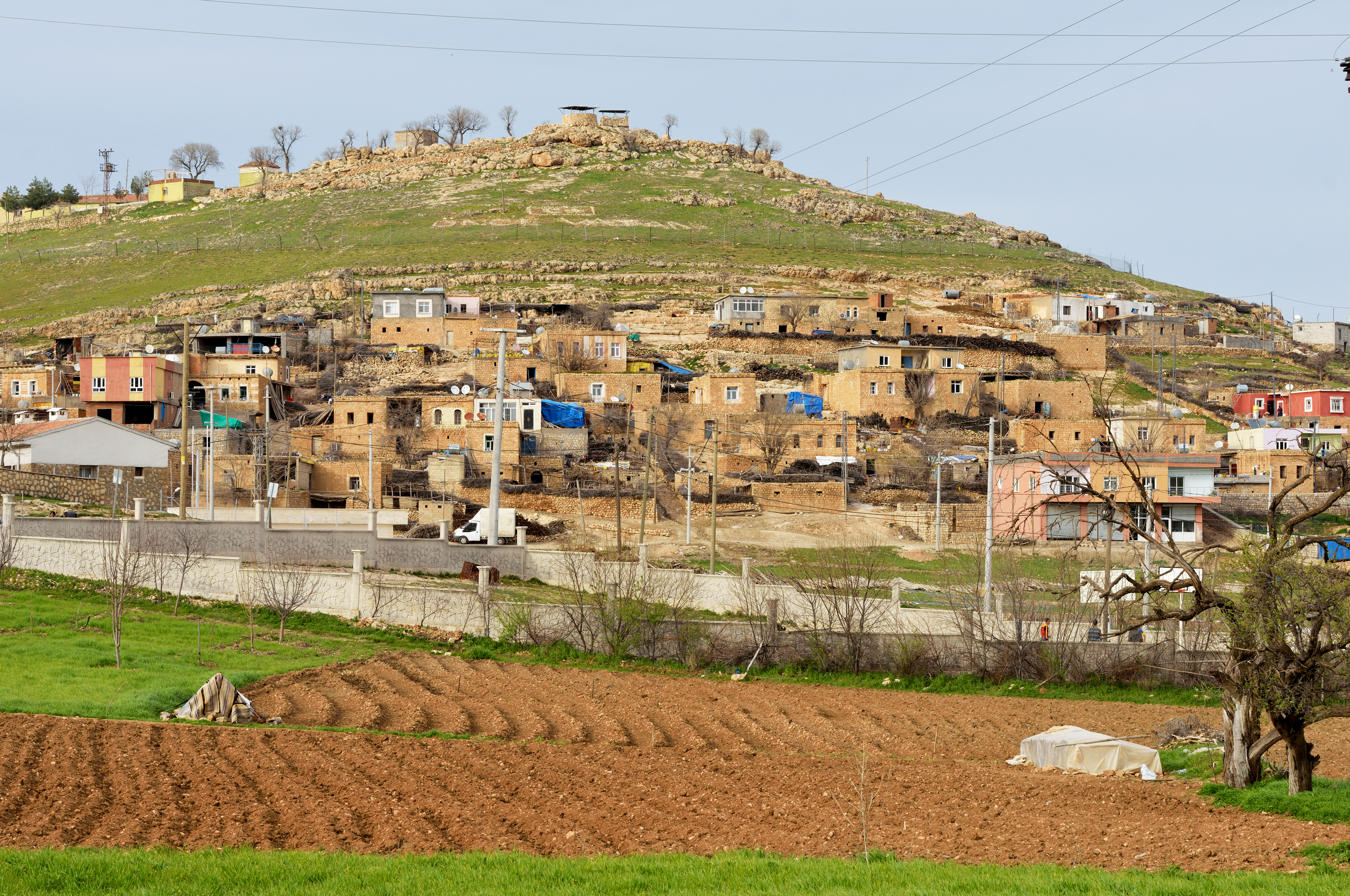

- Location within Turkey
- Coordinates: 37.527°N 40.687°E
- Country: Turkey
- Province: Mardin
- District: Artuklu
- Population (2021): 762
- Time zone: UTC+3 (TRT)

Bağlıca (Kurdish: Bernişt) is a neighbourhood in the municipality and district of Artuklu, Mardin Province in Turkey. The village is populated by Kurds of the Surgucu tribe and had a population of 762 in 2021.
