= Yaylı, Artuklu =

Village in Mardin Province, Turkey

Yaylı
- Neighbourhood
- Location in Turkey
- Coordinates: 37.202°N 40.754°E
- Country: Turkey
- Province: Mardin
- District: Artuklu
- Population (2021): 1,799
- Time zone: UTC+3 (TRT)

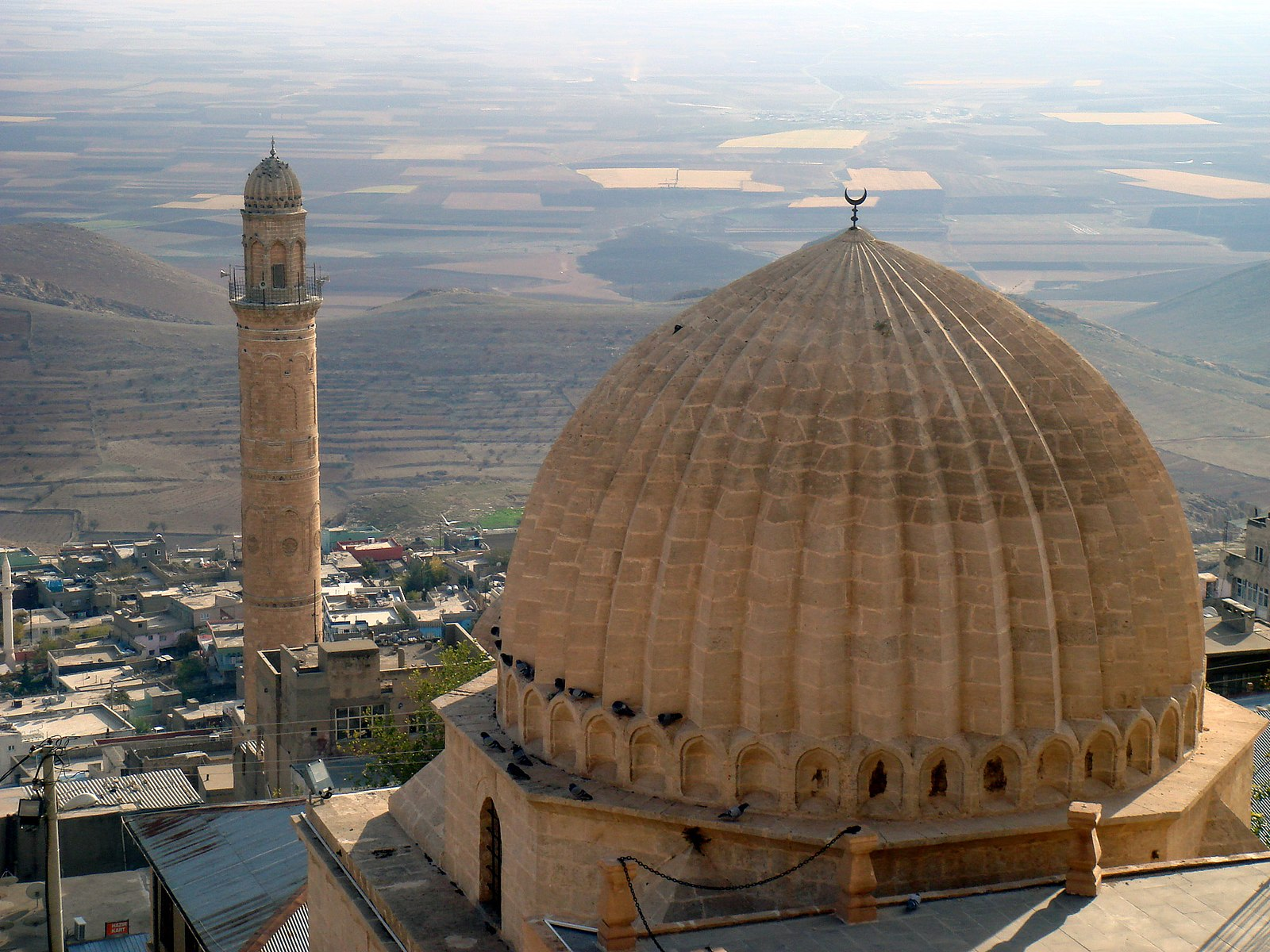
Minaret and dome of the Sultan Isa Medrese in Mardin

Yaylı or Kavs is a neighbourhood in the municipality and district of Artuklu, Mardin Province in Turkey. The village is populated by Arabs of the Tat tribe and had a population of 1,799 in 2021.
