= Elmabahçe, Artuklu =

Village in Mardin Province, Turkey

Elmabahçe
- Neighbourhood
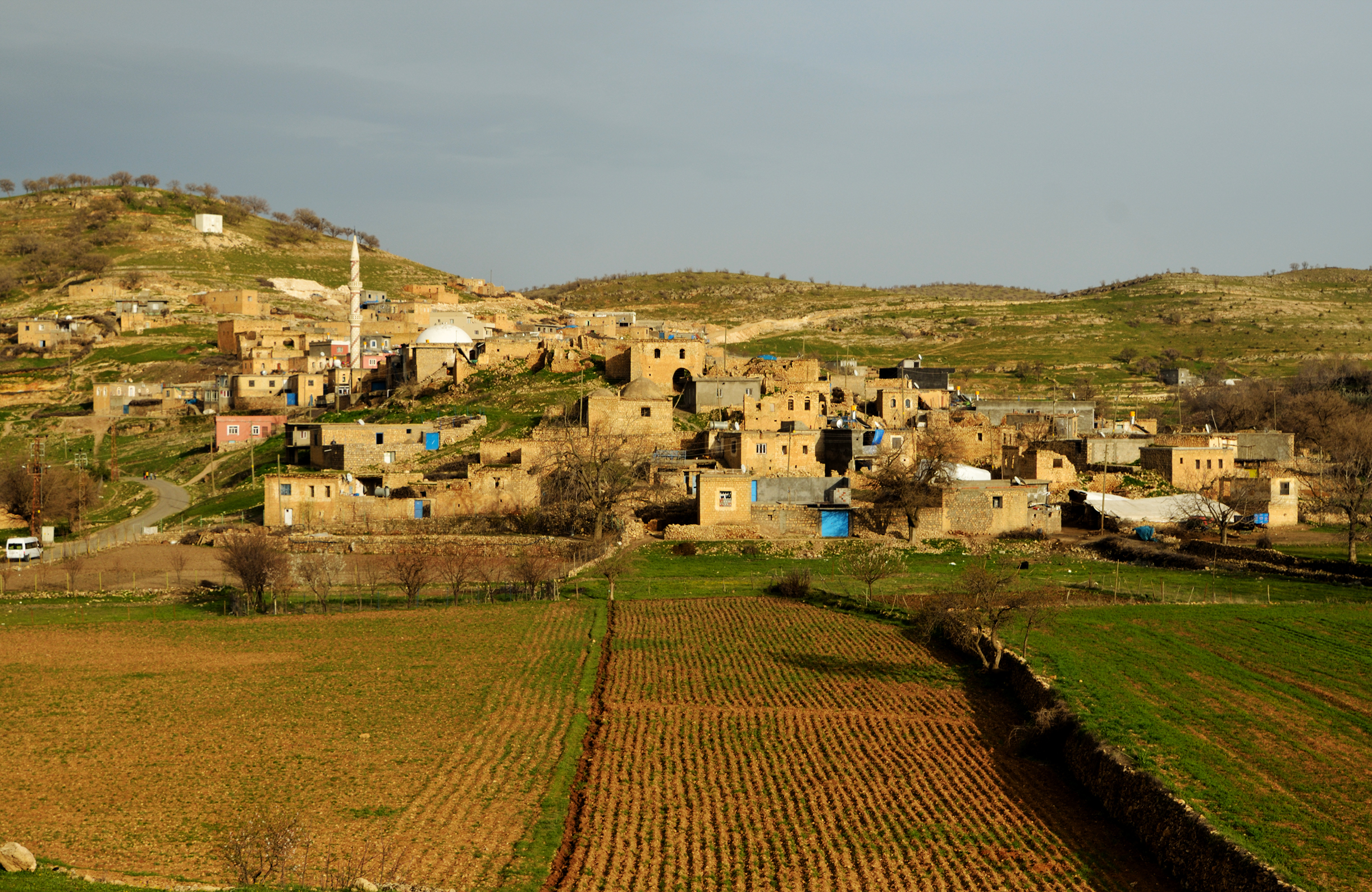

- Location within Turkey
- Coordinates: 37.490°N 40.683°E
- Country: Turkey
- Province: Mardin
- District: Artuklu
- Population (2021): 338
- Time zone: UTC+3 (TRT)

Elmabahçe (Kurdish: Tizyan) (Note: Also spelt as Tezian.) is a neighbourhood in the municipality and district of Artuklu, Mardin Province in Turkey. The village is populated by Kurds of the Surgucu tribe and had a population of 338 in 2021.

== History ==
Tizyan (today called Elmabahçe) was inhabited by 100 Syriacs in 1914, according to the list presented to the Paris Peace Conference by the Assyro-Chaldean delegation. It was located in the kaza of Awina.

== Bibliography ==
- Gaunt, David (2006). Massacres, Resistance, Protectors: Muslim-Christian Relations in Eastern Anatolia during World War I. Gorgias Press.
- Jongerden, Joost; Verheij, Jelle, eds. (2012). Social Relations in Ottoman Diyarbekir, 1870-1915. Brill.
- Tan, Altan (2018). Turabidin'den Berriye'ye. Aşiretler - Dinler - Diller - Kültürler (in Turkish). Pak Ajans Yayincilik Turizm Ve Diş Ticaret Limited şirketi. ISBN 9789944360944.
