= Arpatepe, Artuklu =

Village in Mardin Province, Turkey

Arpatepe
- Neighbourhood
- Location in Turkey
- Coordinates: 37.139°N 40.798°E
- Country: Turkey
- Province: Mardin
- District: Artuklu
- Population (2021): 523
- Time zone: UTC+3 (TRT)

Arpatepe (Kurdish: Tilşihîr, Dêra Xerabê) is a neighbourhood in the municipality and district of Artuklu, Mardin Province in Turkey. The village is populated by Kurds of the Mîlan tribe. It had a population of 523 in 2021.
