= Ambar, Artuklu =

Village in Mardin Province, Turkey

Ambar
- Neighbourhood
- Location in Turkey
- Coordinates: 37.153°N 40.946°E
- Country: Turkey
- Province: Mardin
- District: Artuklu
- Population (2021): 319
- Time zone: UTC+3 (TRT)

Embarê (Kurdish: Embarê) is a neighbourhood in the municipality and district of Artuklu, Mardin Province in Turkey. The village had a population of 319 in 2021.
