= Cevizlik =

Cevizlik may refer to the following villages in Turkey:

- Cevizlik, Ardanuç, in Artvin Province
- Cevizlik, Artuklu, in Mardin Province
- Cevizlik, Kemah, in Erzincan Province
- Cevizlik, Şirvan, in Siirt Province
- Cevizlik, Yusufeli, in Artvin Province
