= Karademir =

Karademir is a Turkish word. It may refer to:

== People ==
- Ahmet Karademir (born 2004), Turkish footballer
- Sude Karademir (born 2001), Turkish handballer
- Tuğba Karademir (born 1985), Turkish figure skater

== Places ==
- Karademir, Artuklu, a neighborhood of Artuklu District in Mardin Province, Turkey
