= Yenice, Artuklu =

Village in Mardin Province, Turkey

Yenice
- Neighbourhood
- Location in Turkey
- Coordinates: 37.134°N 40.977°E
- Country: Turkey
- Province: Mardin
- District: Artuklu
- Population (2021): 40
- Time zone: UTC+3 (TRT)

Yenice (Kurdish: Gundikê Hilo) is a neighbourhood in the municipality and district of Artuklu, Mardin Province in Turkey. The village had a population of 40 in 2021.
