= Sultanköy, Artuklu =

Village in Mardin Province, Turkey

Sultanköy
- Neighbourhood
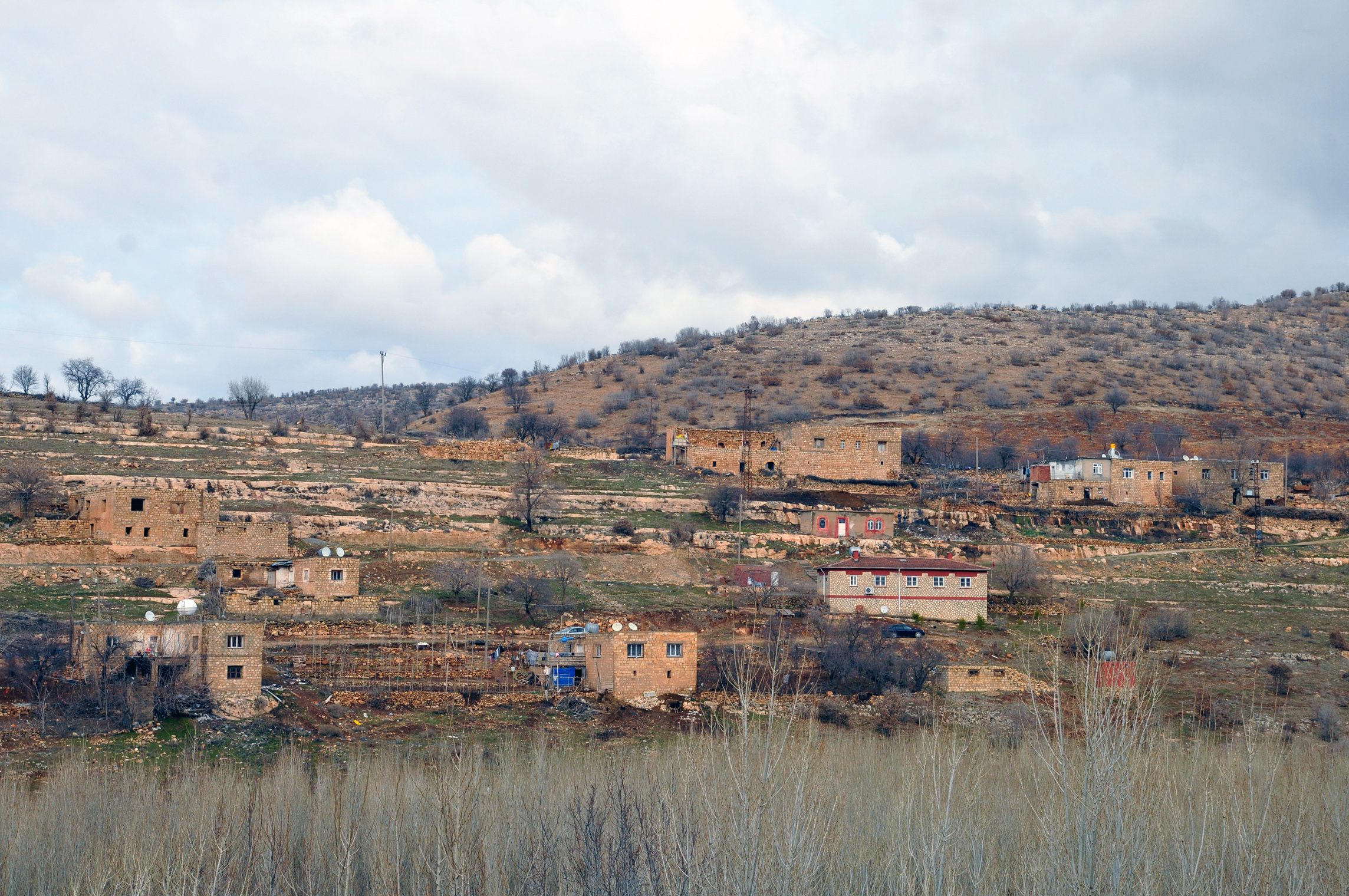

- Location within Turkey
- Coordinates: 37.447°N 40.634°E
- Country: Turkey
- Province: Mardin
- District: Artuklu
- Population (2021): 378
- Time zone: UTC+3 (TRT)

Sultanköy (Kurdish: Siltan Şêxmûs) is a neighbourhood in the municipality and district of Artuklu, Mardin Province in Turkey. The village is populated by Kurds of the Surgucu tribe and had a population of 378 in 2021.
