= Cevizpınarı, Artuklu =

Village in Mardin Province, Turkey

Cevizpınarı
- Neighbourhood
- Location in Turkey
- Coordinates: 37.370°N 40.781°E
- Country: Turkey
- Province: Mardin
- District: Artuklu
- Population (2021): 586
- Time zone: UTC+3 (TRT)

Cevizpınarı (Kurdish: Babilcewz) is a neighbourhood in the municipality and district of Artuklu, Mardin Province in Turkey. The village is populated by Kurds of the Surgucu tribe and had a population of 586 in 2021.
