= Tilkitepe, Artuklu =

Village in Mardin Province, Turkey

Tilkitepe
- Neighbourhood
- Location in Turkey
- Coordinates: 37.125°N 40.969°E
- Country: Turkey
- Province: Mardin
- District: Artuklu
- Population (2021): 186
- Time zone: UTC+3 (TRT)

Tilkitepe (Kurdish: Gundê Semo) is a neighbourhood in the municipality and district of Artuklu, Mardin Province in Turkey. The village had a population of 186 in 2021.
