= Esentepe, Artuklu =

Village in Mardin Province, Turkey

Esentepe
- Neighbourhood
- Location in Turkey
- Coordinates: 37.139°N 41.000°E
- Country: Turkey
- Province: Mardin
- District: Artuklu
- Population (2021): 259
- Time zone: UTC+3 (TRT)

Esentepe (Kurdish: Qesra Ehmedê Xêro) is a neighbourhood in the municipality and district of Artuklu, Mardin Province in Turkey. The village is populated by Kurds of the Mîrsînan tribe and had a population of 259 in 2021.
