= Eryeri, Artuklu =

Village in Mardin Province, Turkey

Eryeri
- Neighbourhood
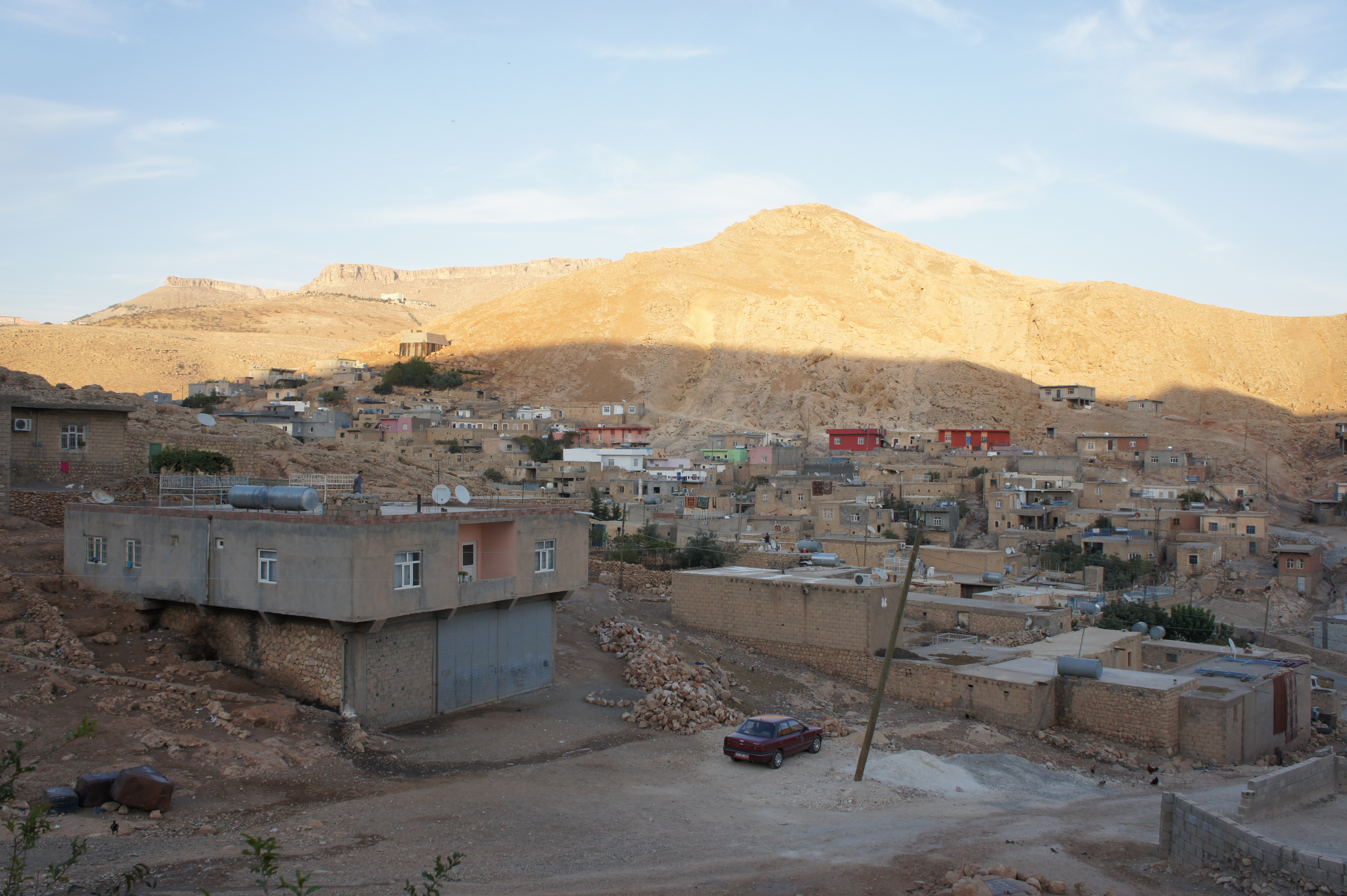

- Location within Turkey
- Coordinates: 37.292°N 40.745°E
- Country: Turkey
- Province: Mardin
- District: Artuklu
- Population (2021): 1,341
- Time zone: UTC+3 (TRT)

Eryeri (Kurdish: Buherkî; Syriac: Bekhaire) (Note: Also known as Bkairy, Bkhere, Bkeera, Bkhireh, Bekéri, Buherki, Büherki, Békiré.) is a neighbourhood in the municipality and district of Artuklu, Mardin Province in Turkey. The village is populated by Kurds of non-tribal affiliation and had a population of 1,341 in 2021.

== History ==
Bekhaire (today called Eryeri) was historically inhabited by Syriac Orthodox Christians and Syriac Catholics. The village was endowed to the Mor Hananyo Monastery by Patriarch Ignatius Peter IV in 1891. It was situated in the Mardin central kaza (district) of the Mardin sanjak in the Diyarbekir vilayet in c. 1900. In 1914, it was inhabited by 200 Syriacs, according to the list presented to the Paris Peace Conference by the Assyro-Chaldean delegation. Upon hearing of the massacres amidst the Sayfo, the abbot of the Mor Hananyo Monastery with the monastery’s property representative met with Khalil Ghazale, chief of the Omeran Kurds, and asked if he could protect the village and suggested the authorities could post guards to the village. Khalil Ghazale swore to protect the village and insisted that additional guards were unnecessary.

However, Khalil Ghazale consequently participated in the attack on the neighbouring village of Bnēbīl, apparently after he had been threatened with death and loss of property by the mayor of Mardin. Khalil Ghazale then invited the people of Bekhaire to a dinner and told them that he and his men would escort them to the Mor Hananyo Monastery so to assure the abbot of their safety. When they reached the well called Bir Mammo, Khalil Ghazale had 15 men from the village killed, their bodies were burned and thrown into the well, and their wives were enslaved, although three women jumped into the well to join their husbands. One source reports that 100 Christians from Bekhaire were killed on 2 June 1915 whilst another source suggests the massacre took place in mid-June. Most of the women later escaped captivity and take refuge at the Mor Hananyo Monastery.

== Bibliography ==
- Abed Mshiho Neman of Qarabash (2021) [1918]. Sayfo – An Account of the Assyrian Genocide. Translated by Michael Abdalla; Łukasz Kiczko. Edinburgh University Press.
- Barsoum, Aphrem (2008). History of the Za'faran Monastery. Translated by Matti Moosa. Gorgias Press.
- Dinno, Khalid S. (2017). The Syrian Orthodox Christians in the Late Ottoman Period and Beyond: Crisis then Revival. Gorgias Press.
- Gaunt, David (2006). Massacres, Resistance, Protectors: Muslim-Christian Relations in Eastern Anatolia during World War I. Gorgias Press.
- Jongerden, Joost; Verheij, Jelle, eds. (2012). Social Relations in Ottoman Diyarbekir, 1870-1915. Brill.
- Tan, Altan (2018). Turabidin'den Berriye'ye. Aşiretler - Dinler - Diller - Kültürler (in Turkish). ISBN 9789944360944.
