= Çıplaktepe, Artuklu =

Village in Mardin Province, Turkey

Çıplaktepe
- Neighbourhood
- Location in Turkey
- Coordinates: 37.155°N 40.841°E
- Country: Turkey
- Province: Mardin
- District: Artuklu
- Population (2021): 305
- Time zone: UTC+3 (TRT)

Çıplaktepe (Kurdish: Gurgurin) is a neighbourhood in the municipality and district of Artuklu, Mardin Province in Turkey. The village is populated by Kurds of the Kîkan tribe and had a population of 305 in 2021.
