= Güneyli, Artuklu =

Village in Mardin Province, Turkey

Güneyli
- Neighbourhood
- Location in Turkey
- Coordinates: 37.132°N 41.014°E
- Country: Turkey
- Province: Mardin
- District: Artuklu
- Population (2021): 196
- Time zone: UTC+3 (TRT)

Güneyli (Kurdish: Kucika) is a neighbourhood in the municipality and district of Artuklu, Mardin Province in Turkey. The village is populated by Kurds of the Mîrsînan tribe and had a population of 196 in 2021.
