= Ahmetli, Artuklu =

Village in Mardin Province, Turkey

Ahmetli
- Neighbourhood
- Location in Turkey
- Coordinates: 37.243°N 40.991°E
- Country: Turkey
- Province: Mardin
- District: Artuklu
- Population (2021): 105
- Time zone: UTC+3 (TRT)

Ahmetli (Kurdish: Ahmedî) is a neighbourhood in the municipality and district of Artuklu, Mardin Province in Turkey. The village is populated by Kurds of the Omerkan tribe and had a population of 105 in 2021.
