= Yaylabaşı, Artuklu =

Village in Mardin Province, Turkey

Yaylabaşı
- Neighbourhood
- Location in Turkey
- Coordinates: 37.448°N 40.777°E
- Country: Turkey
- Province: Mardin
- District: Artuklu
- Population (2021): 249
- Time zone: UTC+3 (TRT)

Yaylabaşı (Kurdish: Şatih) is a neighbourhood in the municipality and district of Artuklu, Mardin Province in Turkey. The village is populated by Kurds of the Surgucu tribe and had a population of 249 in 2021.
