= Özlüce, Artuklu =

Village in Mardin Province, Turkey

Özlüce
- Neighbourhood
- Location in Turkey
- Coordinates: 37.456°N 40.626°E
- Country: Turkey
- Province: Mardin
- District: Artuklu
- Population (2021): 413
- Time zone: UTC+3 (TRT)

Özlüce (Kurdish: Qertê) is a neighbourhood in the municipality and district of Artuklu, Mardin Province in Turkey. The village had a population of 413 in 2021.
