= Yolbaşı, Artuklu =

Village in Mardin Province, Turkey

Yolbaşı
- Neighbourhood
- Location in Turkey
- Coordinates: 37.262°N 40.786°E
- Country: Turkey
- Province: Mardin
- District: Artuklu
- Population (2021): 92
- Time zone: UTC+3 (TRT)

Yolbaşı (Kurdish: Qelendera) is a neighbourhood in the municipality and district of Artuklu, Mardin Province in Turkey. The village is populated by Kurds of the Qelenderan tribe and had a population of 92 in 2021.
