= Alakuş, Artuklu =

Village in Mardin Province, Turkey

Alakuş
- Neighbourhood
- Location in Turkey
- Coordinates: 37.150°N 40.869°E
- Country: Turkey
- Province: Mardin
- District: Artuklu
- Population (2021): 158
- Time zone: UTC+3 (TRT)

Alakuş (Kurdish: Zedyê) is a neighbourhood in the municipality and district of Artuklu, Mardin Province in Turkey. The village is populated by Kurds of the Dakoran tribe and had a population of 158 in 2021.
