= Yeniköy, Artuklu =

Village in Mardin Province, Turkey

Yeniköy
- Neighbourhood
- Location in Turkey
- Coordinates: 37.119°N 41.035°E
- Country: Turkey
- Province: Mardin
- District: Artuklu
- Population (2021): 313
- Time zone: UTC+3 (TRT)

Yeniköy is a neighbourhood in the municipality and district of Artuklu, Mardin Province in Turkey. The village is populated by Kurds of the Mîrsînan tribe and had a population of 313 in 2021.
