= Akbağ, Artuklu =

Village in Mardin Province, Turkey

Akbağ
- Neighbourhood
- Location in Turkey
- Coordinates: 37°22′05″N 40°37′26″E
- Country: Turkey
- Province: Mardin
- District: Artuklu
- Population (2021): 657
- Time zone: UTC+3 (TRT)

Akbağ (Kurdish: Akres) is a neighbourhood in the municipality and district of Artuklu, Mardin Province in Turkey. The village is populated by Kurds of the Surgucu tribe and had a population of 657 in 2021.
