= Aşağıyeniköy, Artuklu =

Village in Mardin Province, Turkey

Aşağıyeniköy
- Neighbourhood
- Location in Turkey
- Coordinates: 37.141°N 40.959°E
- Country: Turkey
- Province: Mardin
- District: Artuklu
- Population (2021): 160
- Time zone: UTC+3 (TRT)

Aşağıyeniköy (Kurdish: Gundikê Osê) is a neighbourhood in the municipality and district of Artuklu, Mardin Province in Turkey. The village had a population of 160 in 2021.
