= Akıncı, Artuklu =

Village in Mardin Province, Turkey

Akıncı
- Neighbourhood
- Location in Turkey
- Coordinates: 37.172°N 40.853°E
- Country: Turkey
- Province: Mardin
- District: Artuklu
- Population (2021): 731
- Time zone: UTC+3 (TRT)

Akıncı (Kurdish: Qesra Qelenderanê) is a neighbourhood in the municipality and district of Artuklu, Mardin Province in Turkey. The village is populated by Kurds of the Qelenderan Kurdish tribe and had a population of 731 in 2021.
