= Yaylacık, Artuklu =

Village in Mardin Province, Turkey

Yaylacık
- Neighbourhood
- Location in Turkey
- Coordinates: 37.442°N 40.684°E
- Country: Turkey
- Province: Mardin
- District: Artuklu
- Population (2021): 697
- Time zone: UTC+3 (TRT)

Yaylacık (Kurdish: Kuferdel) is a neighbourhood in the municipality and district of Artuklu, Mardin Province in Turkey. The village is populated by Kurds of the Surgucu tribe and had a population of 697 in 2021.
