= Yaylaköy, Artuklu =

Village in Mardin Province, Turkey

Yaylaköy
- Neighbourhood
- Location in Turkey
- Coordinates: 37°26′14″N 40°39′35″E
- Country: Turkey
- Province: Mardin
- District: Artuklu
- Population (2021): 313
- Time zone: UTC+3 (TRT)

Yaylaköy (Kurdish: Yaylê) is a neighbourhood in the municipality and district of Artuklu, Mardin Province in Turkey. It is populated by Kurds of the Surgucu tribe and had a population of 313 in 2021.
