= Çayırpınar, Artuklu =

Village in Mardin Province, Turkey

Çayırpınar
- Neighbourhood
- Location in Turkey
- Coordinates: 37.147°N 40.920°E
- Country: Turkey
- Province: Mardin
- District: Artuklu
- Population (2021): 111
- Time zone: UTC+3 (TRT)

Çayırpınar (Kurdish: Kanîguriyê) is a neighbourhood in the municipality and district of Artuklu, Mardin Province in Turkey. The village had a population of 111 in 2021.
