= Kabala, Artuklu =

Village in Mardin Province, Turkey

Kabala
- Neighbourhood
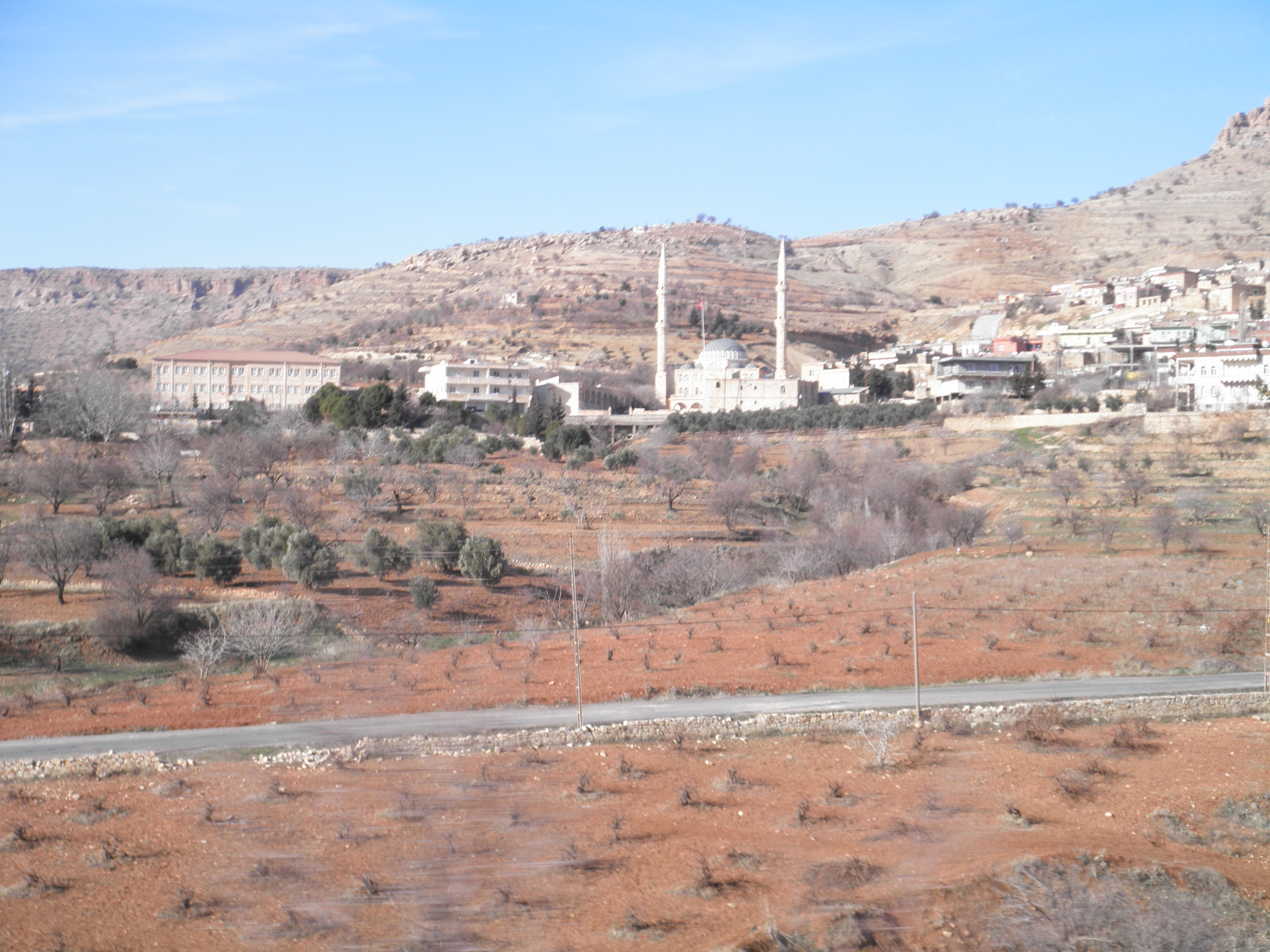

- Location within Turkey
- Coordinates: 37.355°N 40.809°E
- Country: Turkey
- Province: Mardin
- District: Artuklu
- Population (2022): 8,217
- Time zone: UTC+3 (TRT)

Kabala (Arabic: Kebele, Kurdish: Qebala) is a neighbourhood of the municipality and district of Artuklu, Mardin Province, Turkey. Its population is 8,217 (2022). Before the 2013 reorganisation, it was a town (belde).

It is populated by Arabs, Kurds and the Mhallami.

== History ==
Kabala is a former Jewish settlement which today is predominately Arab with moreover a Kurdish population. Kurdish tribes in the village are the Hesinan and the Omerkan.
