= Aytepe, Artuklu =

Village in Mardin Province, Turkey

Aytepe
- Neighbourhood
- Location in Turkey
- Coordinates: 37.254°N 40.992°E
- Country: Turkey
- Province: Mardin
- District: Artuklu
- Population (2021): 194
- Time zone: UTC+3 (TRT)

Aytepe (Kurdish: Kûrka Çeto) is a neighbourhood in the municipality and district of Artuklu, Mardin Province in Turkey. The village is populated by Kurds of the Omerkan tribe and had a population of 194 in 2021.
