= Yukarıyeniköy, Artuklu =

Village in Mardin Province, Turkey

Yukarıyeniköy
- Neighbourhood
- Location in Turkey
- Coordinates: 37.140°N 40.971°E
- Country: Turkey
- Province: Mardin
- District: Artuklu
- Population (2021): 245
- Time zone: UTC+3 (TRT)

Yukarıyeniköy (Kurdish: Pîrabok) is a neighbourhood in the municipality and district of Artuklu, Mardin Province in Turkey. The village had a population of 245 in 2021.
