= Konaklı, Artuklu =

Village in Mardin Province, Turkey

Konaklı
- Neighbourhood
- Location in Turkey
- Coordinates: 37.238°N 40.941°E
- Country: Turkey
- Province: Mardin
- District: Artuklu
- Population (2021): 322
- Time zone: UTC+3 (TRT)

Konaklı (Kurdish: Xirbê Qeblo) is a neighbourhood in the municipality and district of Artuklu, Mardin Province in Turkey. The village is populated by Kurds of the Omerkan tribe and had a population of 322 in 2021.
