= Haydar, Artuklu =

Village in Mardin Province, Turkey

Haydar
- Neighbourhood
- Location in Turkey
- Coordinates: 37.341°N 40.576°E
- Country: Turkey
- Province: Mardin
- District: Artuklu
- Population (2021): 234
- Time zone: UTC+3 (TRT)

Haydar (Kurdish: Gundê Heydo) is a neighbourhood in the municipality and district of Artuklu, Mardin Province in Turkey. The village had a population of 234 in 2021.
