= Yukarıhatunlu, Artuklu =

Village in Mardin Province, Turkey

Yukarıhatunlu
- Neighbourhood
- Location in Turkey
- Coordinates: 37.151°N 40.747°E
- Country: Turkey
- Province: Mardin
- District: Artuklu
- Population (2021): 219
- Time zone: UTC+3 (TRT)

Yukarıhatunlu is a neighbourhood in the municipality and district of Artuklu, Mardin Province in Turkey. The village is populated by Arabs of the Tat tribe and had a population of 219 in 2021.
