= Gökçe, Artuklu =

Village in Mardin Province, Turkey

Gökçe
- Neighbourhood
- Location in Turkey
- Coordinates: 37.207°N 40.697°E
- Country: Turkey
- Province: Mardin
- District: Artuklu
- Population (2022): 10,455
- Time zone: UTC+3 (TRT)

Gökçe or Selah is a neighbourhood of the municipality and district of Artuklu, Mardin Province, Turkey. Its population is 10,455 (2022). Before the 2013 reorganisation, it was a town (belde). Also in 2013, it passed from the district of Kızıltepe to the Artuklu district.

It is populated by Arabs of the Tat tribe.

== Population ==
Historical population of Gökçe:

Population
Year	Pop.	±% p.a.
1935	584	—
1960	822	+1.38%
1965	945	+2.83%
1970	1,195	+4.81%
1980	1,717	+3.69%
1990	3,148	+6.25%
2000	4,729	+4.15%
2010	7,172	+4.25%
2020	9,993	+3.37%
2022	10,455	+2.29%
