= Cevizlik, Artuklu =

Village in Mardin Province, Turkey

Cevizlik
- Neighbourhood
- Location in Turkey
- Coordinates: 37.385°N 40.569°E
- Country: Turkey
- Province: Mardin
- District: Artuklu
- Population (2021): 952
- Time zone: UTC+3 (TRT)

Cevizlik (Kurdish: Cewzat) is a neighbourhood in the municipality and district of Artuklu, Mardin Province in Turkey. The village had a population of 952 in 2021.
