= Artuklu =

Central District of Mardin Province, Turkey

- District and municipality
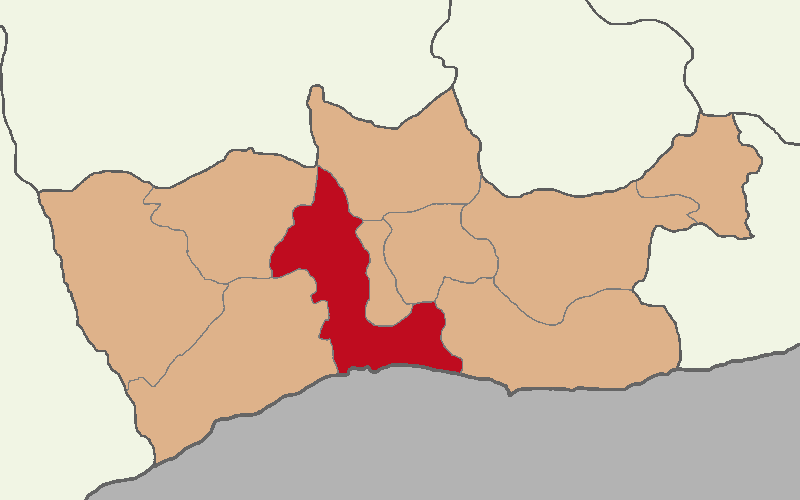
- Map showing Artuklu District in Mardin Province

- Location in Turkey
- Coordinates: 37°19′N 40°44′E
- Country: Turkey
- Province: Mardin

Government
  - Mayor: Mehmet Tatlıdede (AKP)
- Area: 885 km^{2} (342 sq mi)
- Population (2022): 189,769
  - Density: 214/km^{2} (555/sq mi)
- Time zone: UTC+3 (TRT)
- Area code: 0482
- Website: www.artuklu.bel.tr

Artuklu (Kurdish: Ertuqî; Turoyo: ܐܪܬܘܟܠܘ, romanized: Artoklo; Arabic: الأرتقية) is a municipality and district of Mardin Province, Turkey. Its area is 885 km^{2}, and its population is 189,769 (2022). It encompasses the city of Mardin and the adjacent countryside to the north and southeast.

== Government ==
The district Artuklu was created at the 2013 reorganisation from the former central district of Mardin Province. In March 2019, Abdulkadir Tutaşı was elected mayor. He resigned in 2022 due to health problems, and was replaced by Mehmet Tatlıdede. Since August 2021, Mesut Tabakçıoğlu has been the Kaymakam.

== Settlements ==
There are 91 neighbourhoods in Artuklu District, of which 23 were part of the pre-2013 municipality of Mardin:

- 13. Mart
- Acar (Diyarê Dêrê)
- Ahmetli (Ehmedî)
- Akbağ (Akres)
- Akıncı (Qesra Qelenderan)
- Alakuş (Zedyê)
- Alımlı (Bîlalî)
- Ambar (Embarê)
- Aran (Zonê)
- Arpatepe (Tilşihîr)
- Aşağıyeniköy (Gundikê Osê)
- Avcılar (Mûsîkan)
- Aytepe (Kûrka Çeto)
- Bağlıca (Bernişt)
- Boztepe
- Buğday (Bixêdîk)
- Çabuk
- Çağlar (Xincika)
- Çalışlı (Şeqlan)
- Çatak
- Çayırpınar (Kanîguriyê)
- Cevizlik (Cewzat)
- Cevizpınarı (Babilcewz)
- Çiftlikköy (Çeltûk)
- Çıplaktepe (Gurgurin)
- Çukuryurt (Curnik)
- Cumhuriyet
- Dara (Darê)
- Dibektaş (Dîbek)
- Diyarbakırkapı
- Düzlük (Domiza)
- Elmabahçe (Tizyan)
- Eminettin
- Ensar
- Eroğlu (Hindûla)
- Eryeri (Buherkî)
- Esentepe (Qesra Ehmedê Xêro)
- Eskikale (Qelitmera)
- Gökçe
- Göllü (Ksor, Goliyê)
- Gül
- Güneyli (Kucika)
- Gürağaç (Derduka)
- Hamzabey
- Hatunlu
- Haydar (Gundê Heydo)
- Hüyüklü (Girmasek)
- İstasyon
- Kabala (Kebele, Qebala)
- Karademir
- Kayacan
- Konaklı (Xirbê Qeblo)
- Kotek
- Küçükköy (Gundik)
- Kumlu
- Kuyulu
- Latifiye
- Medrese
- Necmettin
- Nur
- Nur (Akıncı)
- Ofis
- Ortaköy
- Özlüce (Qertê)
- Sakalar (Şevreşk)
- Şar
- Saraçoğlu
- Savurkapı
- Şehidiye
- Sulak (Sarincê)
- Sultanköy (Siltan Şêxmûs)
- Tandır (Sirêckê)
- Teker
- Tilkitepe (Gundê Semo)
- Tozan (Xubêr)
- Ulucami
- Yalım (Mansuriye)
- Yardere (Qurdîsê)
- Yaylabaşı (Şatih)
- Yaylacık (Kuferdel)
- Yaylaköy (Yaylê)
- Yaylı
- Yenice (Gundikê Hilo)
- Yenikapı
- Yeniköy
- Yenişehir
- Yolbaşı (Qelendera)
- Yüce (Şêxan)
- Yukarıaydınlı (Qeraşîka jor)
- Yukarıhatunlu
- Yukarıyeniköy (Pîrabok)
