= Çağlar, Nusaybin =

Village in Mardin Province, Turkey

Çağlar
- Neighbourhood
- Location in Turkey
- Coordinates: 37.113°N 41.226°E
- Country: Turkey
- Province: Mardin
- District: Nusaybin
- Population (2021): 584
- Time zone: UTC+3 (TRT)

Çağlar (Kurdish: Şanîşê) is a neighbourhood in the municipality and district of Nusaybin, Mardin Province in Turkey. The village is populated by Kurds of the Koçekan tribe and had a population of 584 in 2021.
