= Ortaköy, Artuklu =

Village in Mardin Province, Turkey

Ortaköy Horren
- Neighbourhood
- Location in Turkey
- Coordinates: 37.222°N 40.785°E
- Country: Turkey
- Province: Mardin
- District: Artuklu
- Population (2022): 10,363
- Time zone: UTC+3 (TRT)

Ortaköy (Kurdish: Girik) is a neighbourhood (mahalle) of the municipality and district of Artuklu, Mardin Province, Turkey. Its population is 10,363 (2022). Before the 2013 reorganisation, it was a town (belde). It is populated by Arabs of the Tat tribe and Kurds.

== Etymology ==
The current Turkish name of the town is a common settlement name which translates to 'middle/center village'. Previous recorded names include Horîncük, Harrîn, and Gülharrin, meaning 'wild rose'. Ortaköy is locally also called Horren.

== Population ==
Historic population figures of Ortaköy:

Historical population
Year	Pop.	±% p.a.
1965	987	—
1970	1,118	+2.52%
1980	1,999	+5.98%
1990	3,089	+4.45%
2000	5,120	+5.18%
2010	7,153	+3.40%
2020	9,900	+3.30%
2022	10,363	+2.31%
