= Çağlar, Artuklu =

Village in Mardin Province, Turkey

Çağlar
- Neighbourhood
- Location in Turkey
- Coordinates: 37.342°N 40.656°E
- Country: Turkey
- Province: Mardin
- District: Artuklu
- Population (2021): 658
- Time zone: UTC+3 (TRT)

Çağlar (Kurdish: Xincika) is a neighbourhood in the municipality and district of Artuklu, Mardin Province in Turkey. The village had a population of 658 in 2021.
