= Küçükköy, Artuklu =

Village in Mardin Province, Turkey

Küçükköy
- Neighbourhood
- Location in Turkey
- Coordinates: 37.130°N 40.854°E
- Country: Turkey
- Province: Mardin
- District: Artuklu
- Population (2021): 303
- Time zone: UTC+3 (TRT)

Küçükköy (Kurdish: Gundik) is a neighbourhood in the municipality and district of Artuklu, Mardin Province in Turkey. The village is populated by Kurds of the Dakoran tribe and had a population of 303 in 2021.
