= Karademir, Artuklu =

Village in Mardin Province, Turkey

Karademir
- Neighbourhood
- Location in Turkey
- Coordinates: 37.197°N 40.809°E
- Country: Turkey
- Province: Mardin
- District: Artuklu
- Population (2021): 56
- Time zone: UTC+3 (TRT)

Karademir (Kurdish: Xarpaşikê) is a neighbourhood in the municipality and district of Artuklu, Mardin Province in Turkey. The village is populated by Kurds of the Qelenderan tribe and had a population of 56 in 2021.
