= Küçükköy, Borçka =

Küçükköy Dakvara
- Neighbourhood
- Location in Turkey
- Coordinates: 41.3878°N 41.5668°E
- Country: Turkey
- Province: Artvin
- District: Borçka
- Municipality: Borçka
- Population (2021): 784
- Time zone: UTC+3 (TRT)

Küçükköy is a neighbourhood of the town Borçka, Borçka District, Artvin Province, Turkey. As of 2021, it had a population of 784 people.

== History ==
According to Ottoman sources, name of the neighbourhood is Dakvara or Takvara. Most inhabitants of the neighbourhood are ethnically Laz.
