= Mardin Province =

Province of Turkey

Coordinates: 37°21′47″N 40°54′31″E

- Province and metropolitan municipality
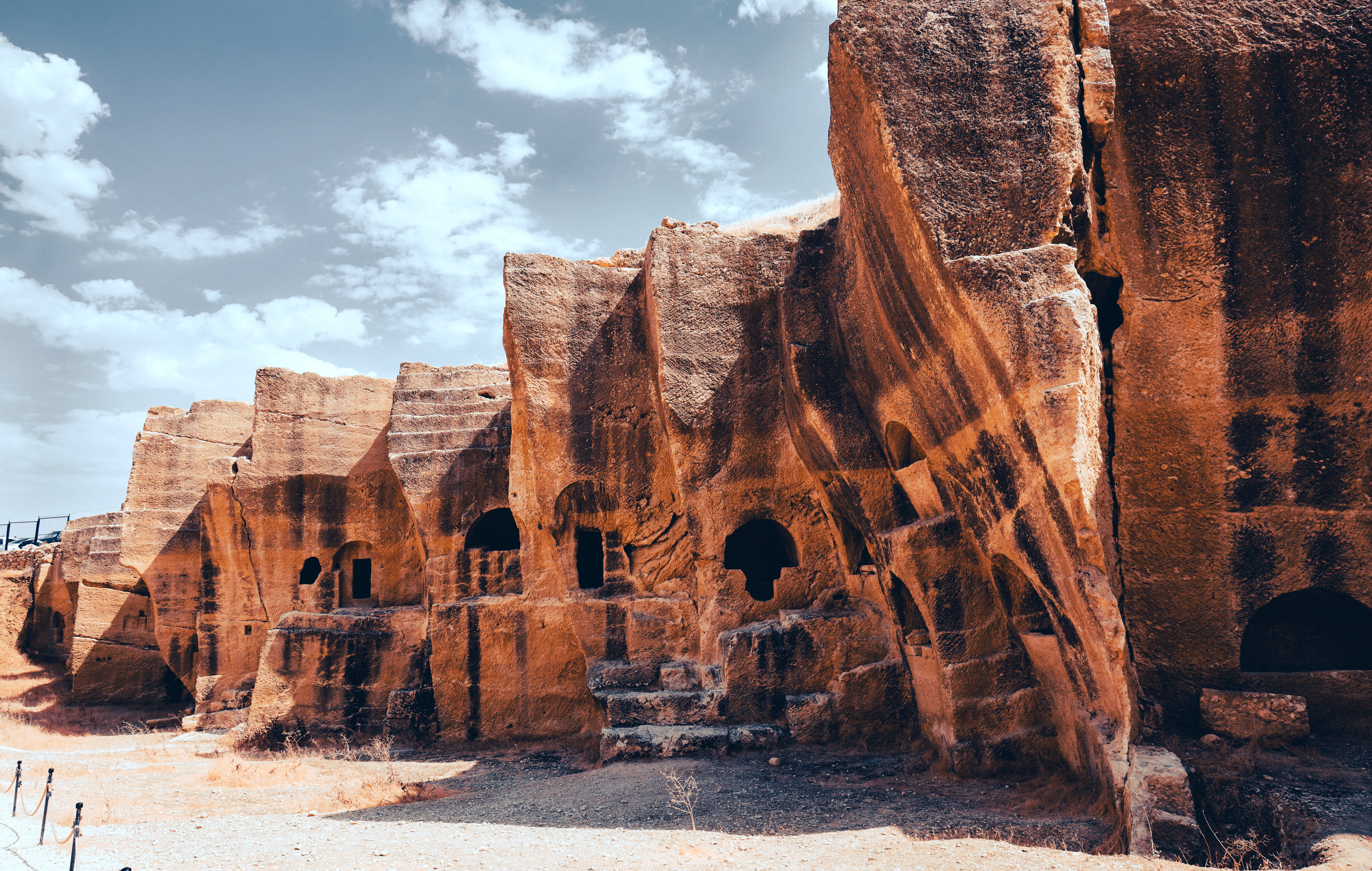
- Ancient city of Dara

- Location of the province within Turkey
- Country: Turkey
- Seat: Mardin

Government
  - Governor: Tuncay Akkoyun
- Area: 8,780 km^{2} (3,390 sq mi)
- Population (2022): 870,374
  - Density: 99.1/km^{2} (257/sq mi)
- Time zone: UTC+3 (TRT)
- Area code: 0482
- Website: www.mardin.bel.tr www.mardin.gov.tr

Mardin Province (Turkish: Mardin ili; Kurdish: Parêzgeha Mêrdîn; Arabic: محافظة ماردين; Classical Syriac: ܡܪܕܝܢ ܗܘܦܪܟܝܐ) is a province and metropolitan municipality in Turkey. Its area is 8,780 km^{2}, and its population is 870,374 (2022). The largest city in the province is Kızıltepe, while the capital Mardin is the second largest city.

== Districts ==
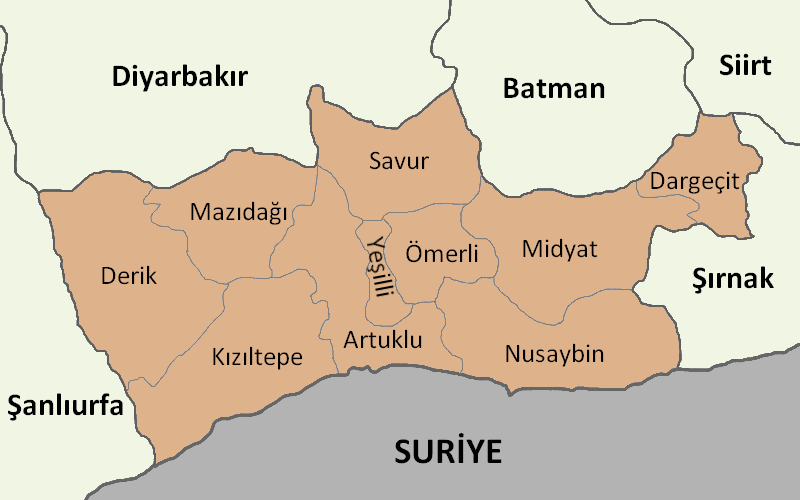
Mardin district locations

Mardin Province is divided into 10 districts:

- Artuklu
- Dargeçit
- Derik
- Kızıltepe
- Mazıdağı
- Midyat
- Nusaybin
- Ömerli
- Savur
- Yeşilli

== Demographics ==
Mardin Province is a linguistically, ethnically and religiously diverse province. The dominant ethnic groups are Arabs, Arameans, and Kurds, of which Kurds constitute a majority. Other minor groups include Armenians, Chechens and Turks, while Jews lived in the area before migrating to Israel around 1948. The Chechens settled in the region during the Russo-Turkish War in 1877/1878.

The distinctive Mhallami community also reside in the district.

The province is considered part of Turkish Kurdistan. In 1990, it was estimated that Kurds constituted 75% of the population.

=== Social relations ===
Social relations between Arabs and Kurds have historically been difficult with hostility, prejudice and stereotypes but have in recent years improved. Arabs with Assyrians did not take part in the Kurdish–Turkish conflict and the position of the two groups have been described as being 'submissive' to the Turkish state, creating distrust between them and the Kurds. Kurds perceived Arabs as spies for the state and local Arabs in Mardin city tended to exclude and dominate local politics in the city. Arabs started losing their grip on Mardin city in the 2010s and the Kurdish BDP won the city in the local elections in 2014. Mardin city had previously been governed by pro-state parties supported by local Arabs.

Despite the difficult relations, Arab families have since the 1980s joined the Kurdish cause, and Arab and Assyrian politicians from Mardin are found in Peoples' Democratic Party including Mithat Sancar and Februniye Akyol.

=== Language ===
Mother tongue, Mardin Province, 1927 Turkish census
Turkish	Greek	Armenian	French	Italian	English	Arabic	Persian (Note: Acemce, which can also refer to the Achomi language.)	Jewish (Note: Yahudice, which can also refer to the Hebrew language or any Judeo-Arabic dialect.)	Circassian	Kurdish	Tatar	Albanian	Bulgarian	Syriac (Note: Süryani, which can also refer to the classical extinct liturgical Syriac language.)
11,864	25	22	11	7	3	51,734	–	71	15	109,841	1	49	1	9,812

In the first Turkish census in 1927, Kurdish and Arabic were the first language for 60.9% and 28.7% of the population, respectively. Turkish stood as the third largest language at 6.6%. In the 1935 census, Kurdish and Arabic remained the two most spoken languages for 63.8% and 24.9% of the population, respectively. Turkish remained as the third largest language at 6.9%. In the 1945 census, Kurdish stood at 66.4%, Arabic at 24.1% and Turkish at 5.6%. In 1950, the numbers were 66.3%, 23.1% and 7.5% for Kurdish, Arabic and Turkish, respectively. The same numbers were 65.8%, 16.5% and 12.9% in 1955, and 66.4%, 20.9% and 8.6% in 1960. In the last Turkish census in 1965, Kurdish remained the largest language spoken by 71% of the population, while Arabic remained the second largest language at 20% and Turkish stood at 8.9%.

A 2018 estimate put the Kurdish language at 70%, Arabic at 30% and Syriac at less than 1%.

=== Religion ===
In the Ottoman yearbook of 1894–1895, Mardin Sanjak had a population of 34,361 and 75.8% adhered to Islam. The largest religious minority was Syriac Orthodox Assyrians who comprised 9.9% of the population, followed by Catholic Armenians at 8.3%, Catholic Assyrians at 3.4%, Protestants at 1.6% and Chaldeans at 0.9%.

Religion, Mardin Province, 1927 Turkish census
Muslim	Catholic	Protestant	Orthodox	Armenian	Christian	Jewish	Other religion	Unknown
163,274	1,634	157	1	118	3,601	490	9,521	1,660

Muslims comprised 90.5% of the population in 1927, while Christians of various denominations stood at 3.1% and Jews at 0.3%. In 1935, Muslims comprised 91.2% of the population, while Christians remained the second largest minority at 5.3%. The Jewish population declined to 72 individuals from 490 in 1927. In 1945, 92.1% of the population was Muslim, while Christians were 3.8% of the population. The same numbers were 93.2% and 6.8% in 1955. In 1960, Muslims constituted 93.7% and Christians remained at 6.3%. Same numbers were 91.9% and 5.7% in 1965.

It was estimated that 25,000 Assyrian members of the Syriac Orthodox Church still lived in the province in 1979. Only 4,000 Assyrians remained in the province in 2020, most having migrated to Europe or Istanbul since the 1980s.

=== Economy ===
In Mardin agriculture is an important branch accounting for 70% of the province's income. Bulgur, lentils or wheat and other grains are produced. In the capital, there are many civil servants, mostly Turks. Close markets for foreign trade are Syria and Iraq.

== History ==
The first known civilization were the Subarian-Hurrians who were then succeeded in 3000 BCE by the Hurrians. The Akkadian Empire gained control around 2230 BCE and were followed by the Assyrians, Babylonians, Hittites, Assyrians again, Romans and Byzantines.

The local Assyrians, while reduced due to the Assyrian genocide and Kurdish-Turkish conflict, hold on to two of the oldest monasteries in the world, Dayro d-Mor Hananyo (Turkish Deyrülzafaran, English Saffron Monastery) and Deyrulumur Monastery. The Christian community is concentrated on the Tur Abdin plateau and in the town of Midyat, with a smaller community (approximately 200) in the provincial capital. After the foundation of Turkey, the province has been a target of a Turkification policy, removing most traces of a non-Turkish heritage.

=== Inspectorate General ===
In 1927 the office of the Inspector general was created, which governed with martial law. The province was included in the First Inspectorate-General (Turkish: Birinci Umumi Müfettişlik) over which the Inspector General ruled. The Inspectorate-General span over the provinces of Hakkâri, Siirt, Van, Mardin, Bitlis, Sanlıurfa, Elaziğ and Diyarbakır. The Inspectorate General were dissolved in 1952 during the Government of the Democrat Party. The Mardin province was also included in a wider military zone in 1928, in which the entrance to the zone was forbidden for foreigners until 1965.

=== State of Emergency ===
In 1987 the province was included in the OHAL region governed in a state of emergency. In November 1996 the state of emergency regulation was removed.

== Largest cities ==
Largest cities or towns in Mardin Province (2021)
Rank		Pop.
1	Kızıltepe	184,124
2	Mardin	129,864
3	Nusaybin	84,445
4	Midyat	83,148
5	Derik	20,566
6	Dargeçit	14,976
7	Mazıdağı	13,117
8	Yeşilli	10,846
9	Gökçe	10,190
10	Ortaköy	10,096

== Gallery ==
Islamic monuments in Mardin Province

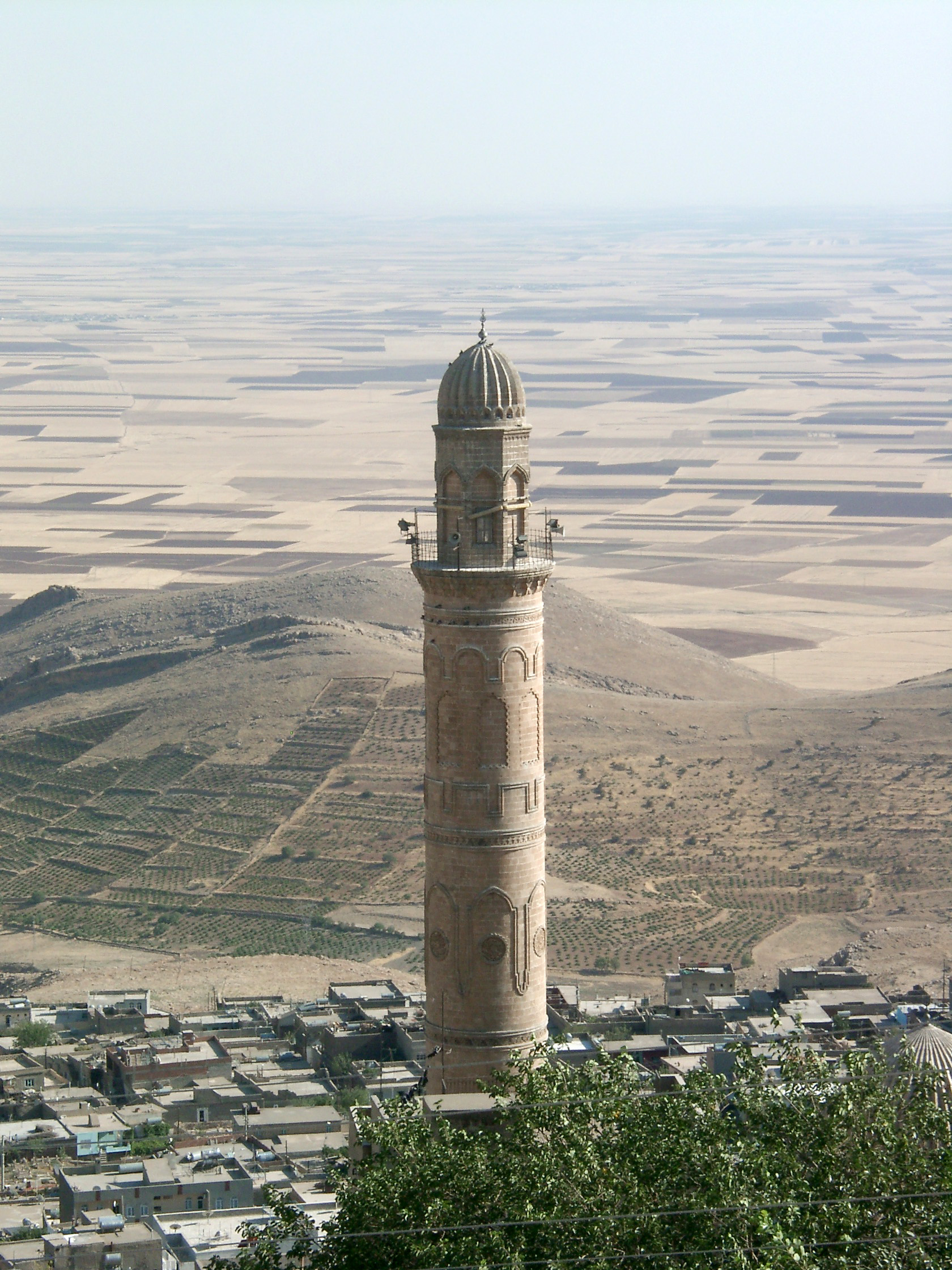
Minaret of the Grand Mosque of Mardin (12th century) and the view of the Mesopotamian plains.

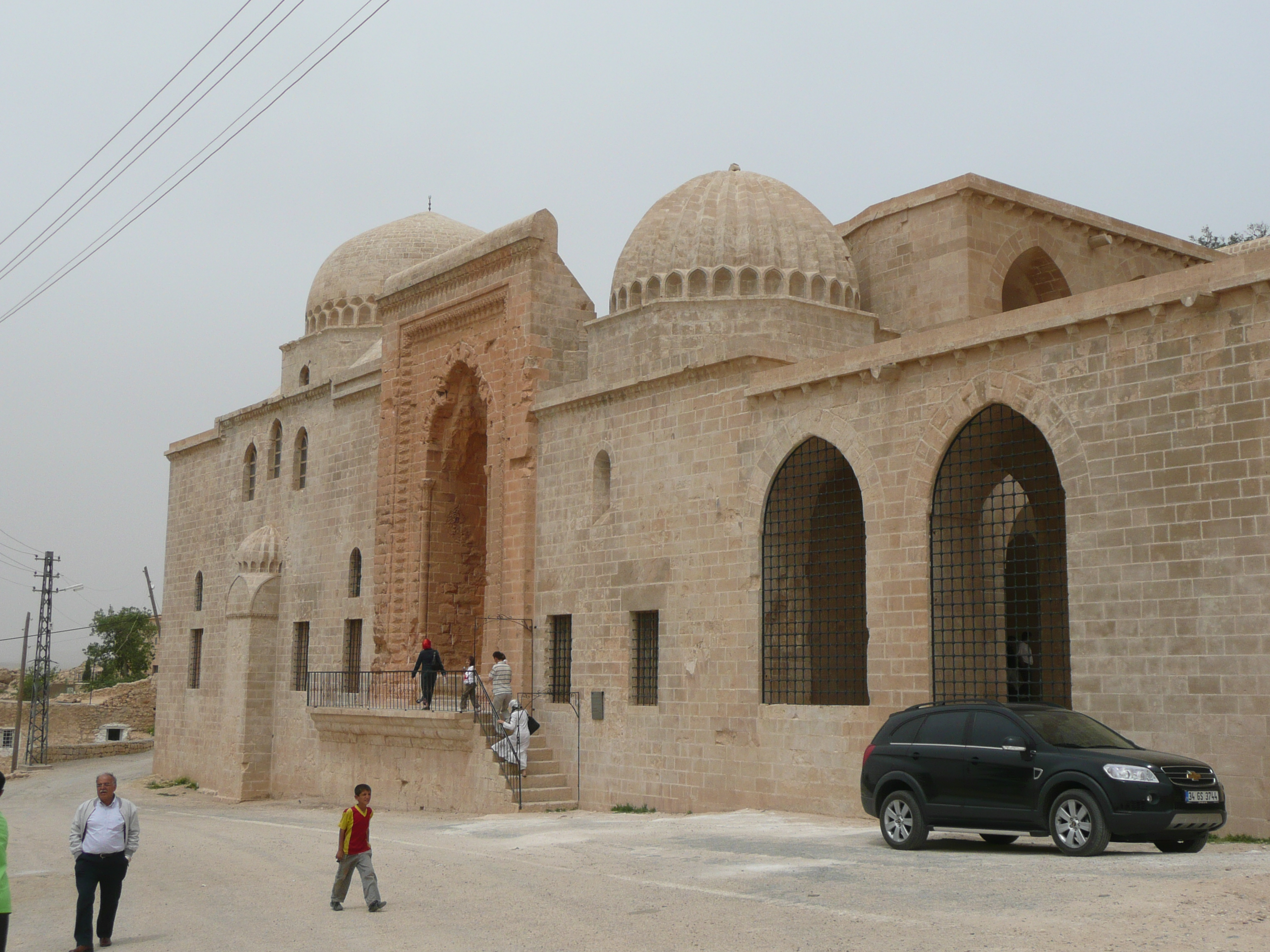
Kasimiye Madrasa (14th century)

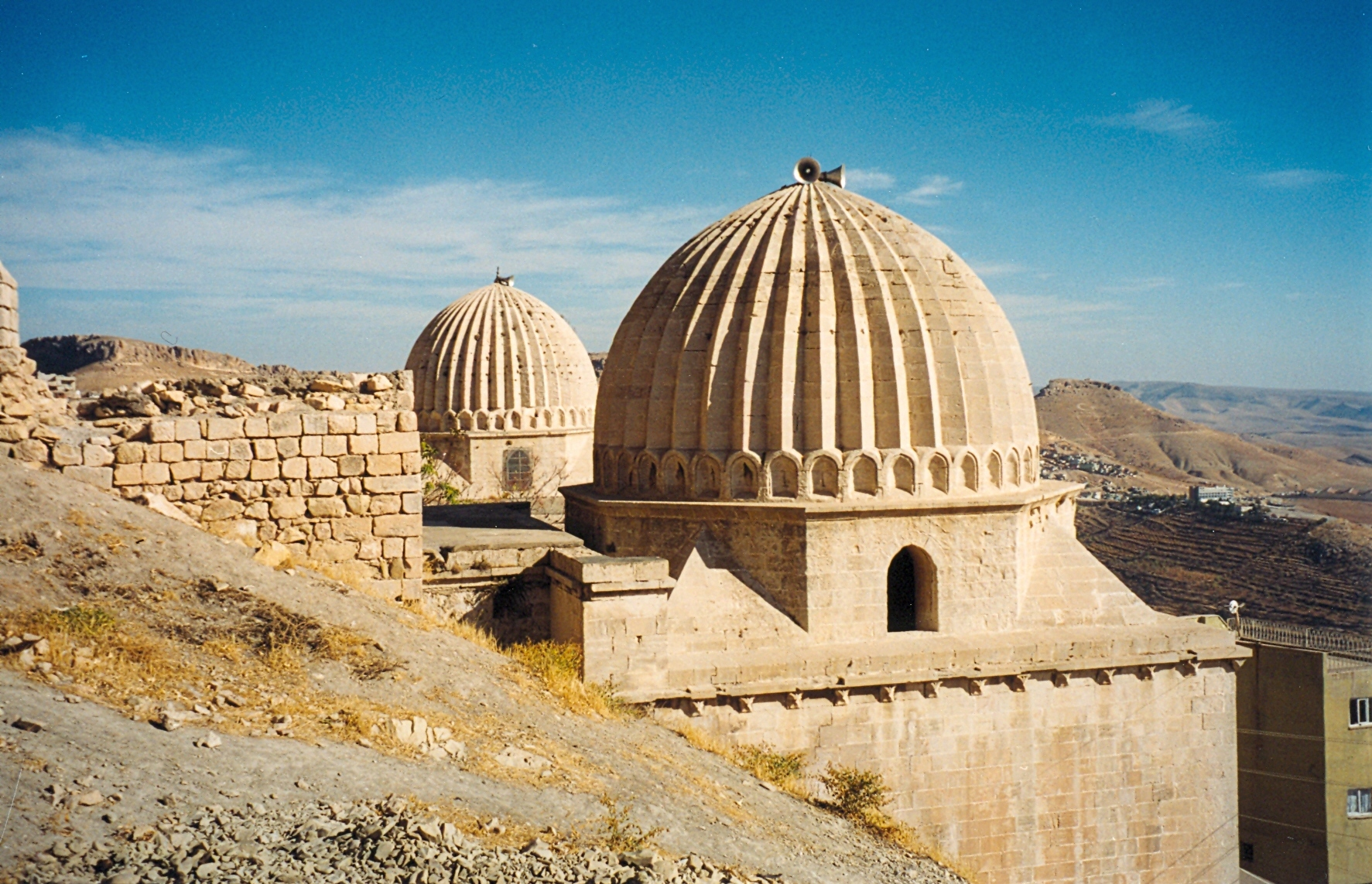
Zinciriye Madrasa (14th century)

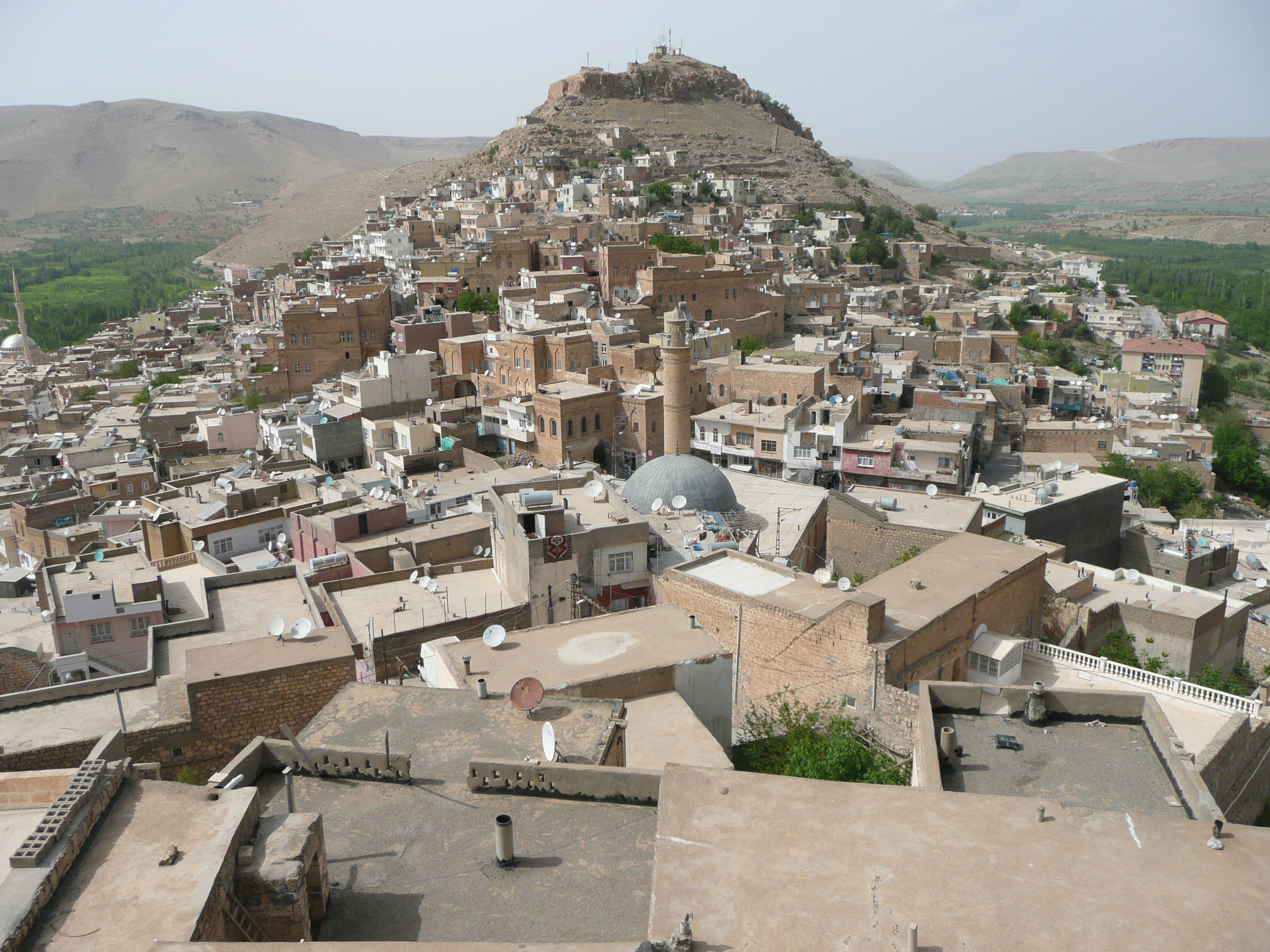
View of Savur and the grand mosque in the center

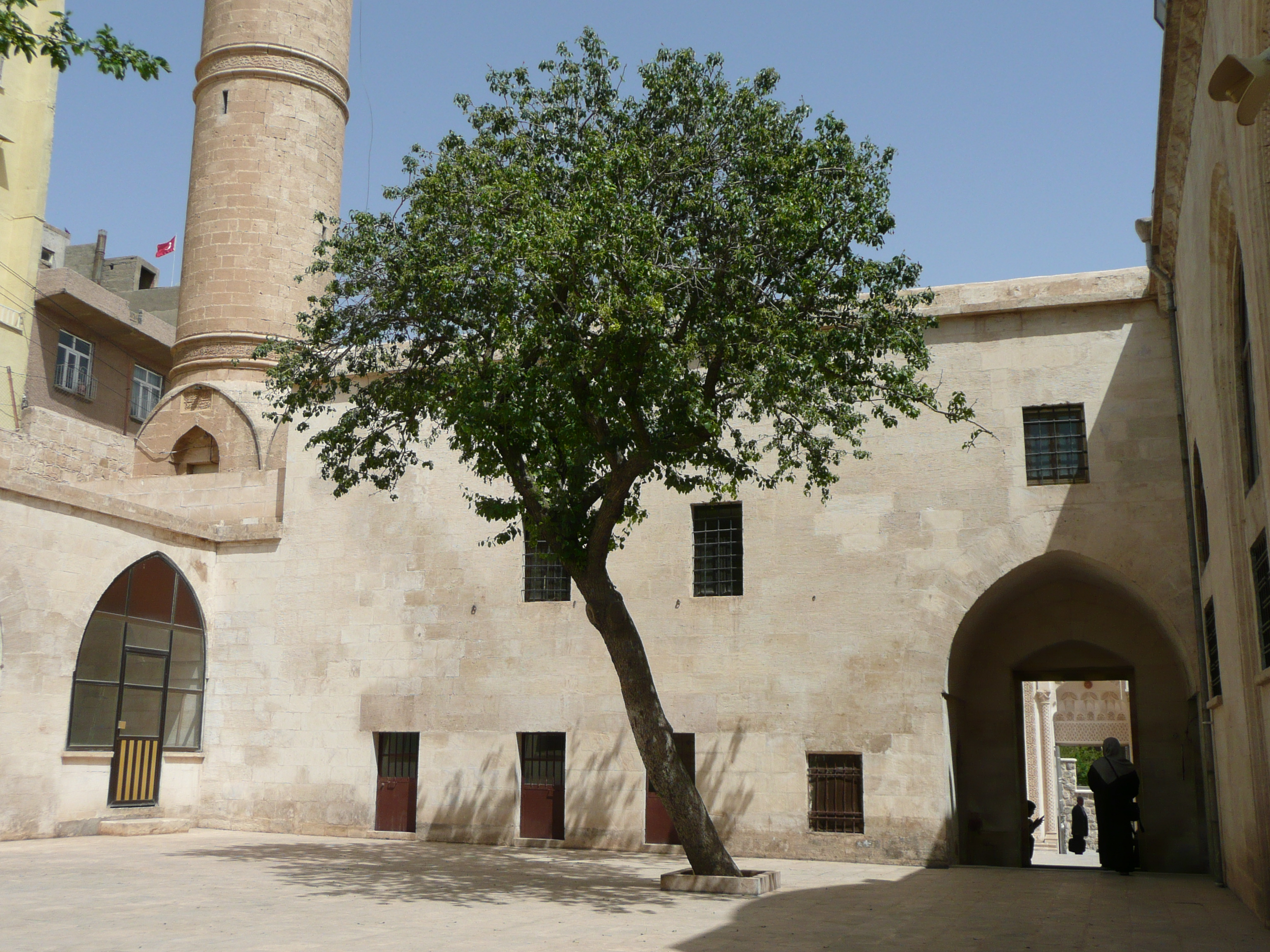
Abdullatif Mosque (14th century)
Christian monuments in Mardin Province

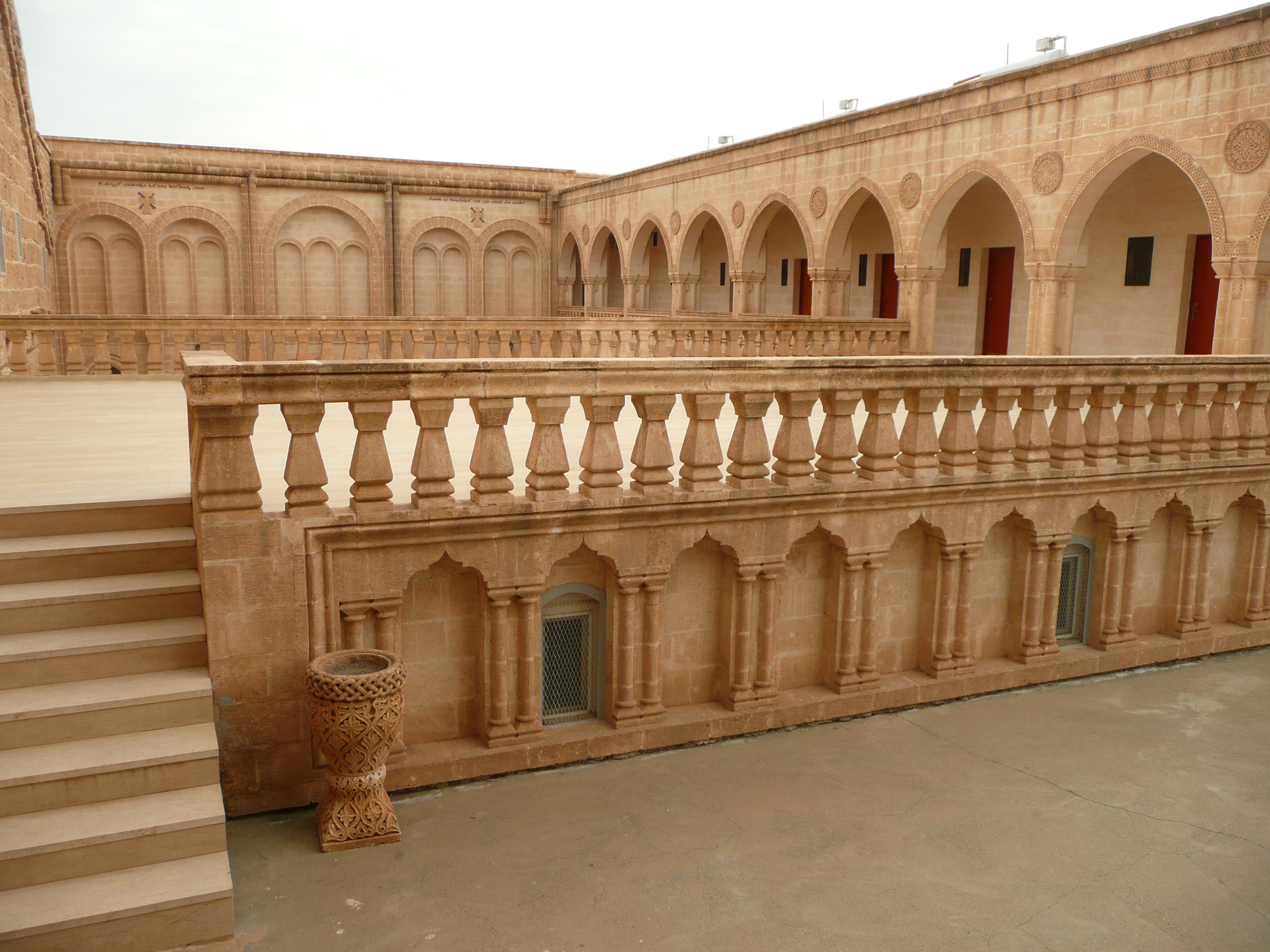
Mor Gabriel Monastery

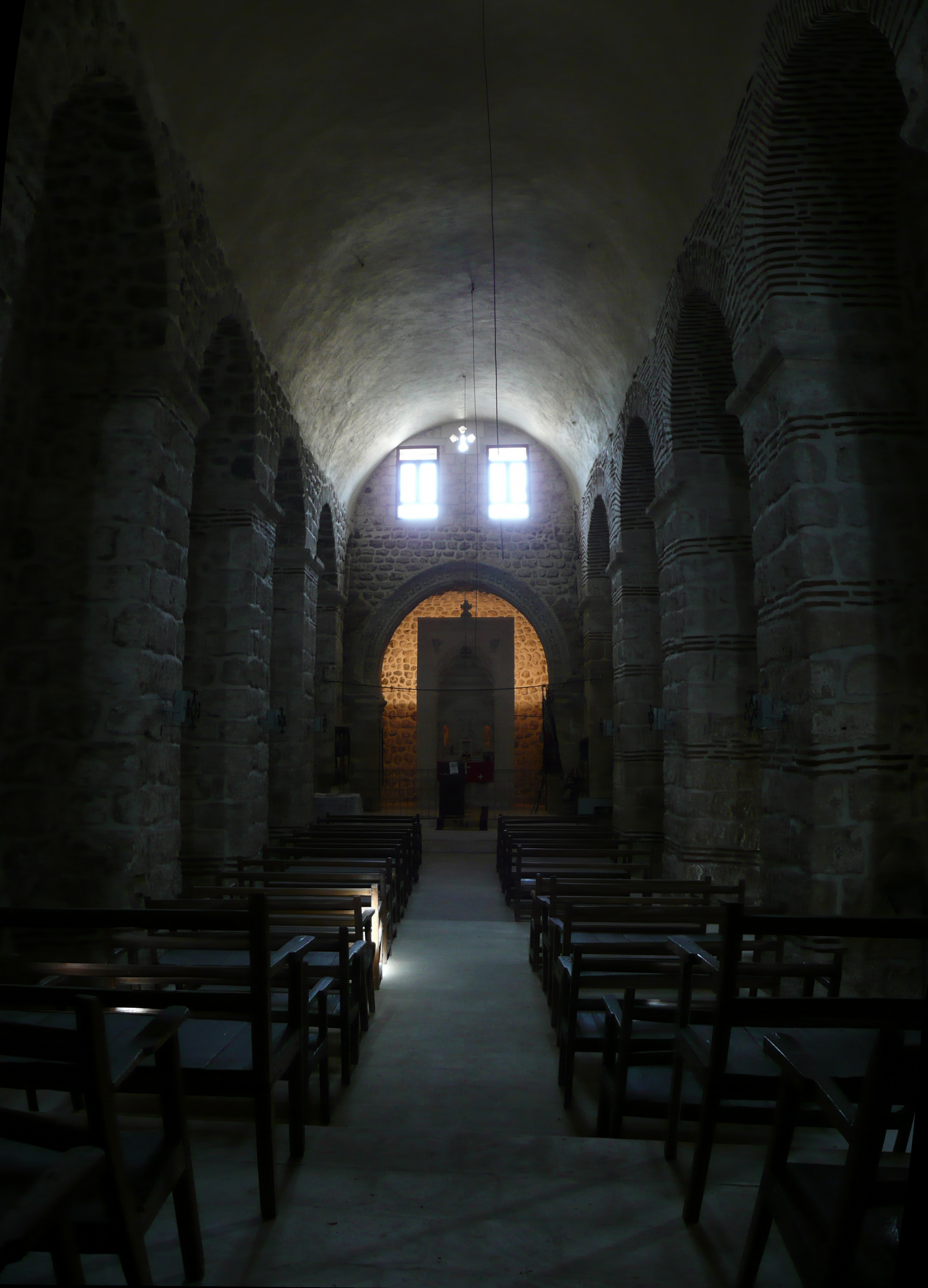
Mor Yuhanun Church

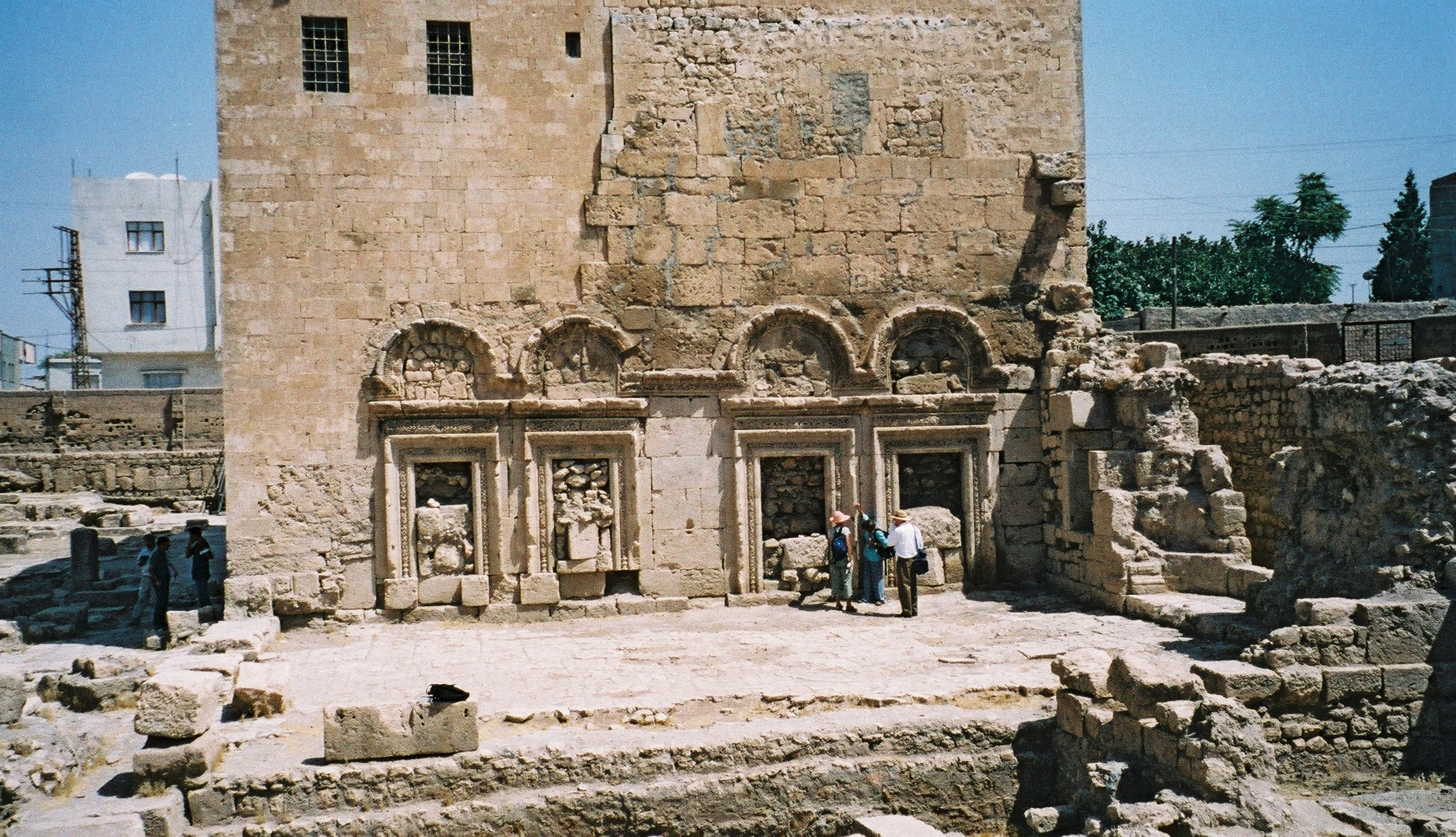
Mar Jacob Church in Nusaybin

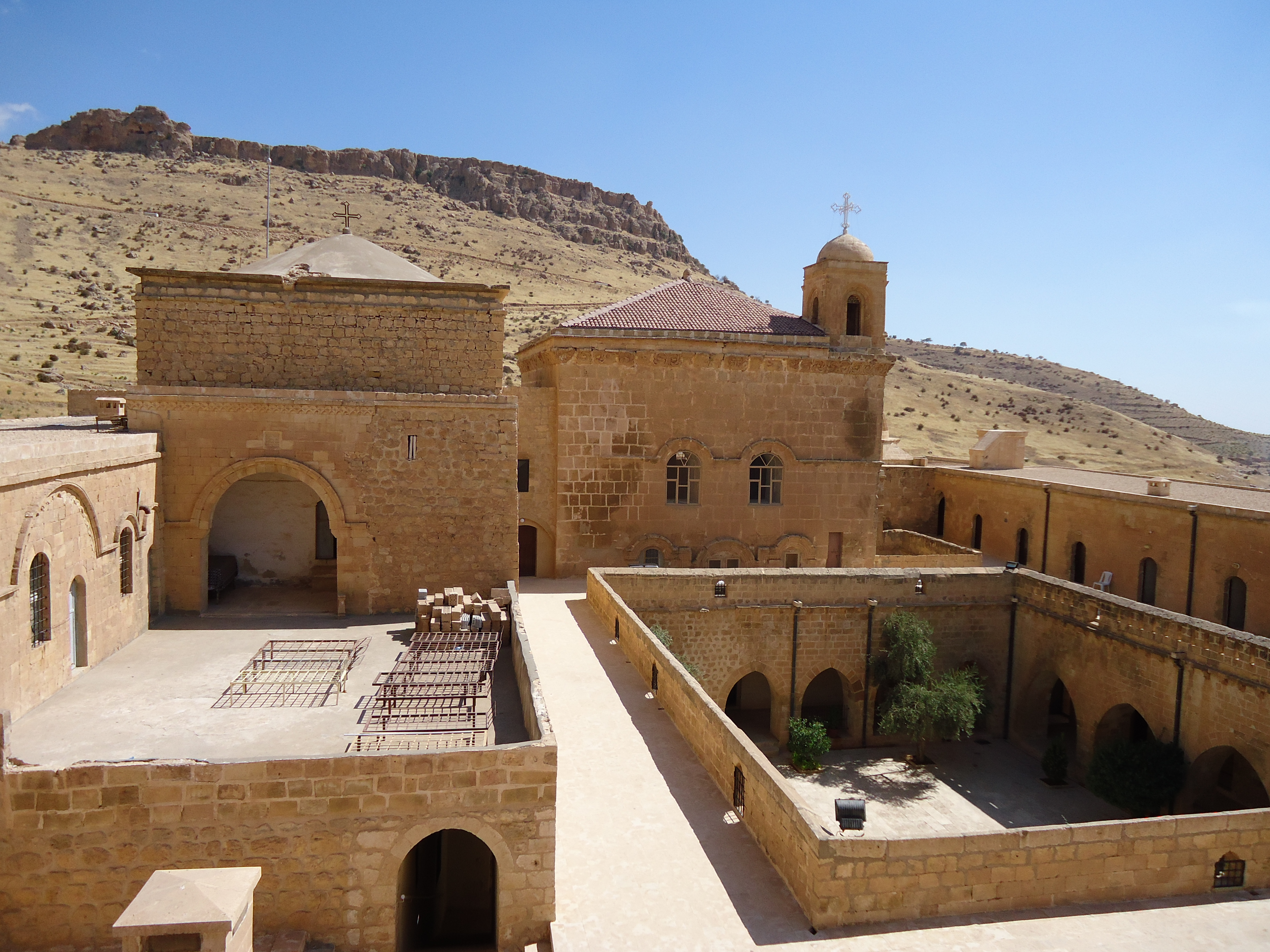
Dayro d-Mor Hananyo monastery

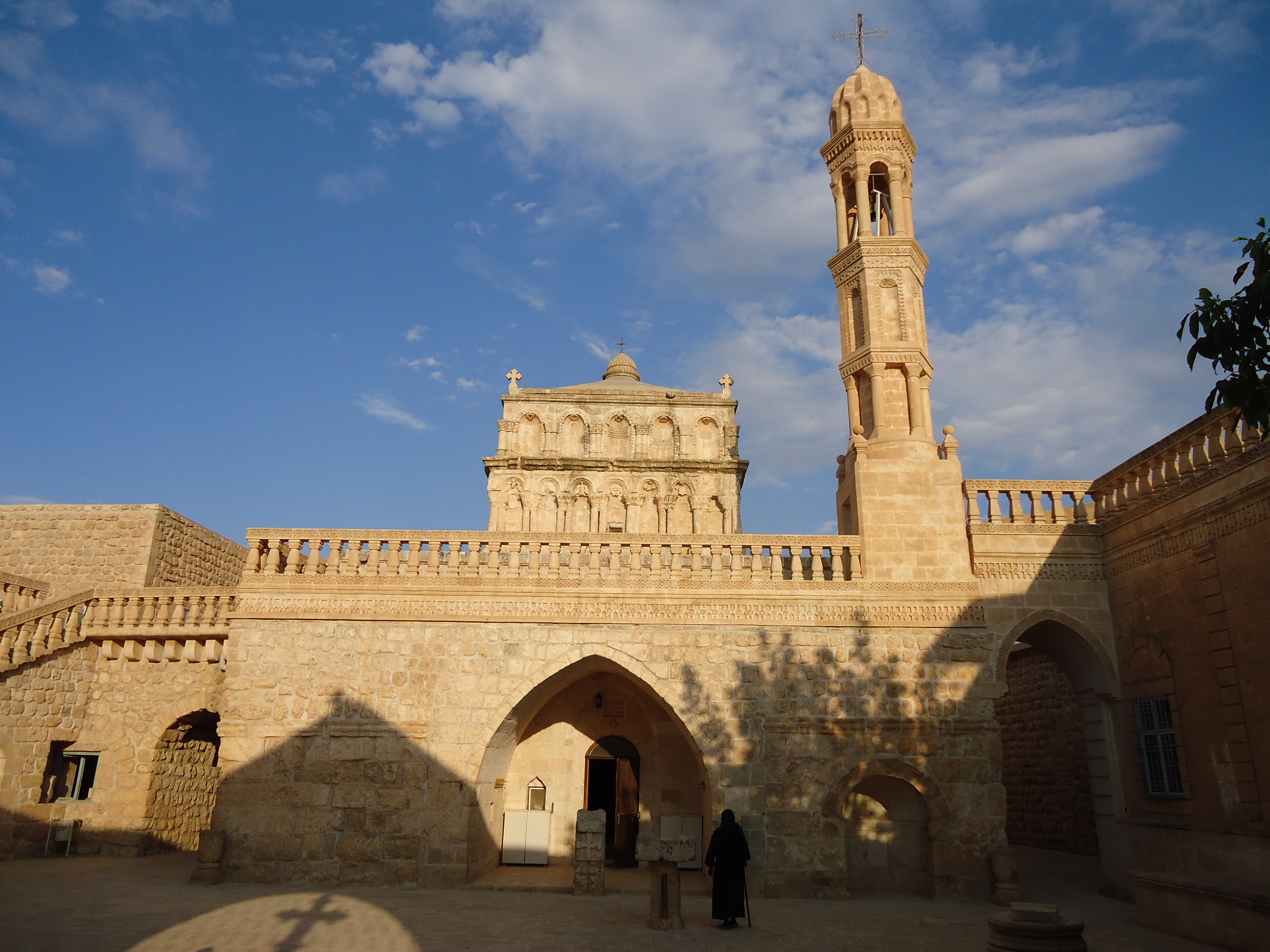
Syriac Orthodox Church in Midyat

=== Bibliography ===
- Dündar, Fuat (2000), Türkiye nüfus sayımlarında azınlıklar (in Turkish), ISBN 9789758086771
