= Üçerli, Savur =

Village in Mardin Province, Turkey

Üçerli
- Neighbourhood
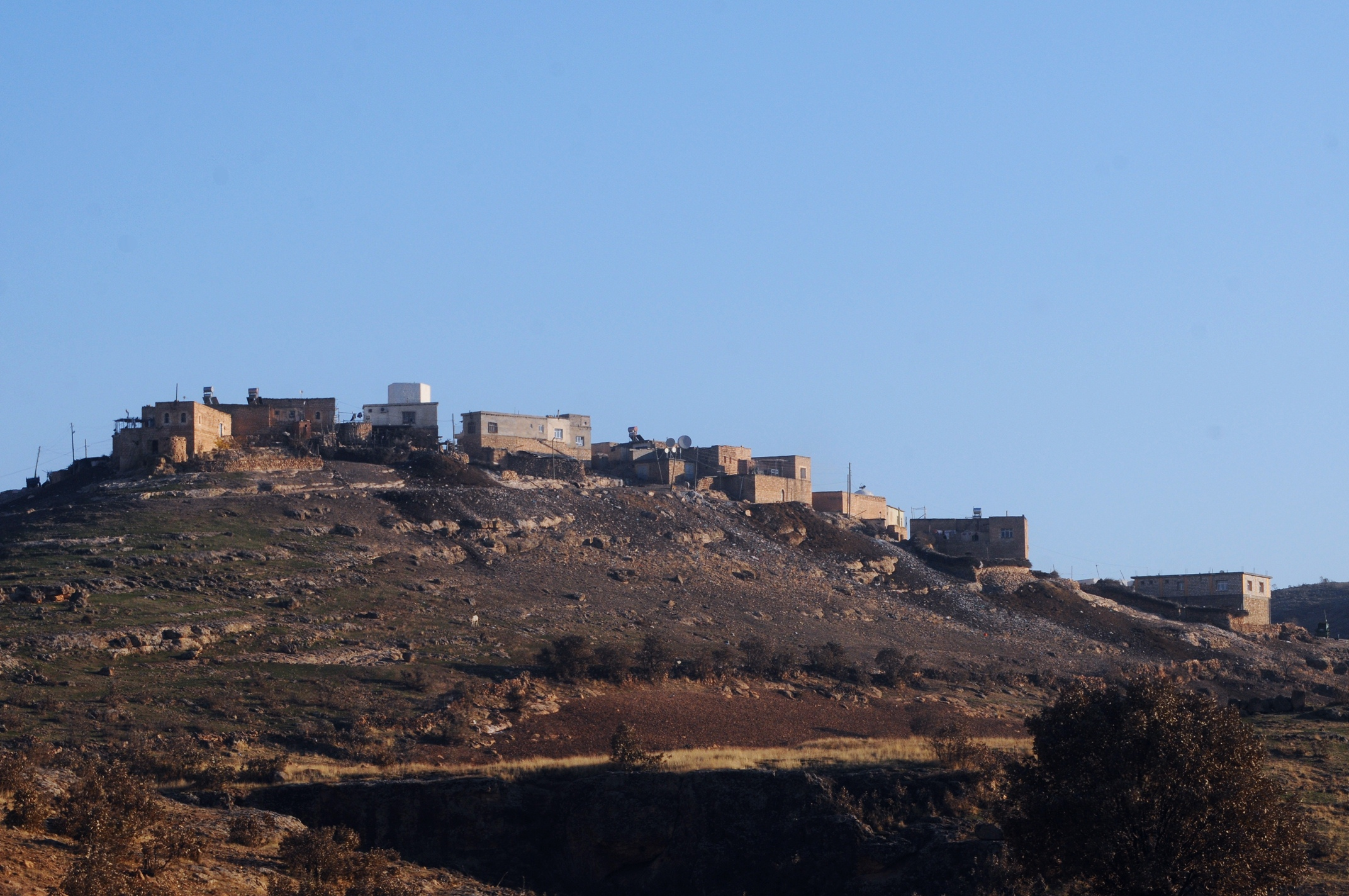

- Location within Turkey
- Coordinates: 37.620°N 40.943°E
- Country: Turkey
- Province: Mardin
- District: Savur
- Population (2021): 282
- Time zone: UTC+3 (TRT)

Üçerli (Kurdish: Dêrteyar) is a neighbourhood in the municipality and district of Savur, Mardin Province in Turkey. The village is populated by Kurds of the Dereverî tribe and had a population of 282 in 2021.
