= Karaköy, Savur =

Village in Mardin Province, Turkey

Karaköy
- Neighbourhood
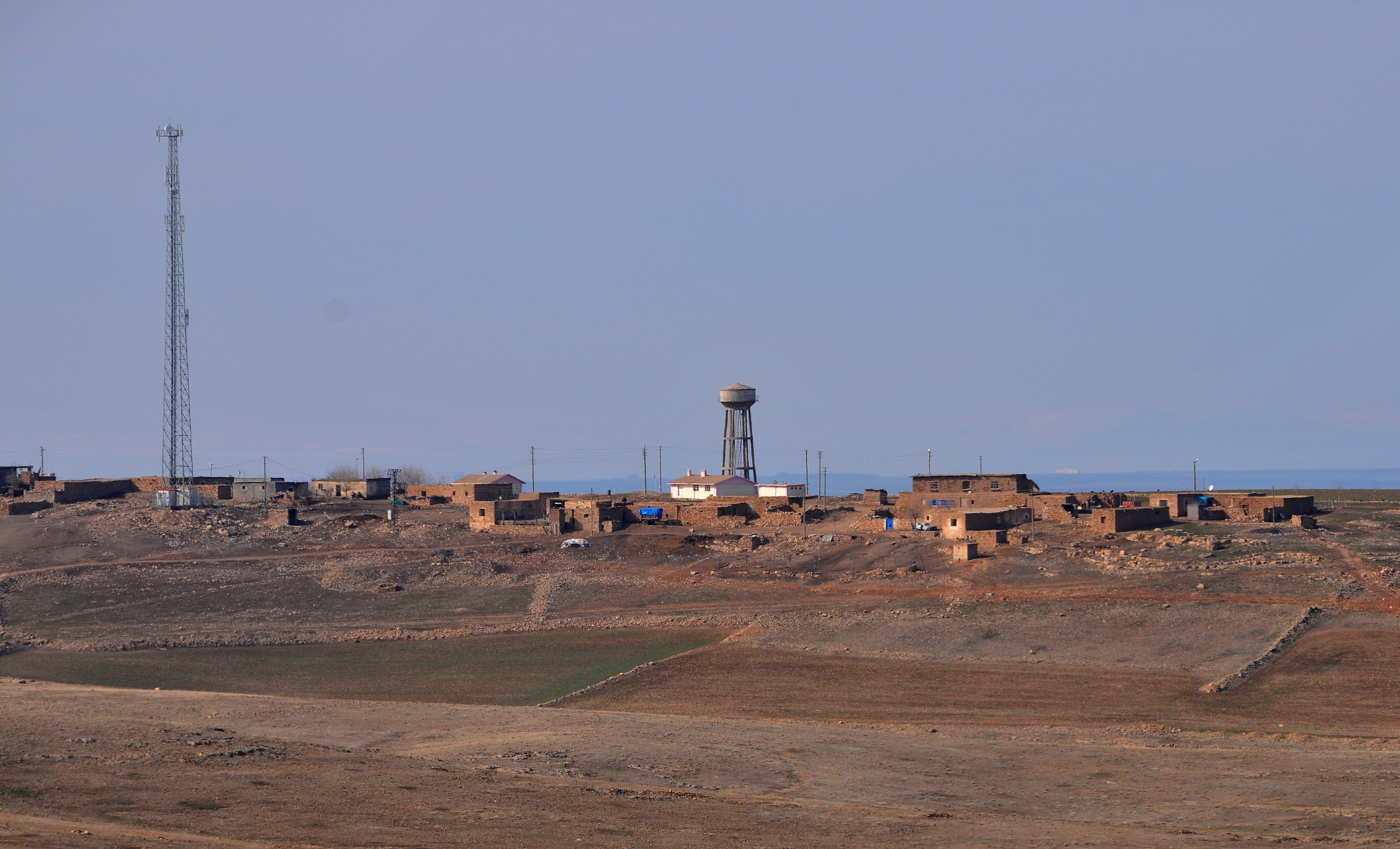

- Location within Turkey
- Coordinates: 37.668°N 40.677°E
- Country: Turkey
- Province: Mardin
- District: Savur
- Population (2021): 65
- Time zone: UTC+3 (TRT)

Karaköy (Kurdish: Xerabreş) is a neighbourhood in the municipality and district of Savur, Mardin Province in Turkey. The village is populated by Kurds of the Surgucu tribe and had a population of 65 in 2021.
