= Kayacıklar, Savur =

Village in Mardin Province, Turkey

Kayacıklar
- Neighbourhood
- Location in Turkey
- Coordinates: 37.672°N 41.053°E
- Country: Turkey
- Province: Mardin
- District: Savur
- Population (2021): 313
- Time zone: UTC+3 (TRT)

Kayacıklar (Kurdish: Bazikê) is a neighbourhood in the municipality and district of Savur, Mardin Province in Turkey. The village is populated by Kurds of the Dereverî tribe and had a population of 313 in 2021.
