= Sürgücü, Savur =

Village in Mardin Province, Turkey

Sürgücü
- Neighbourhood
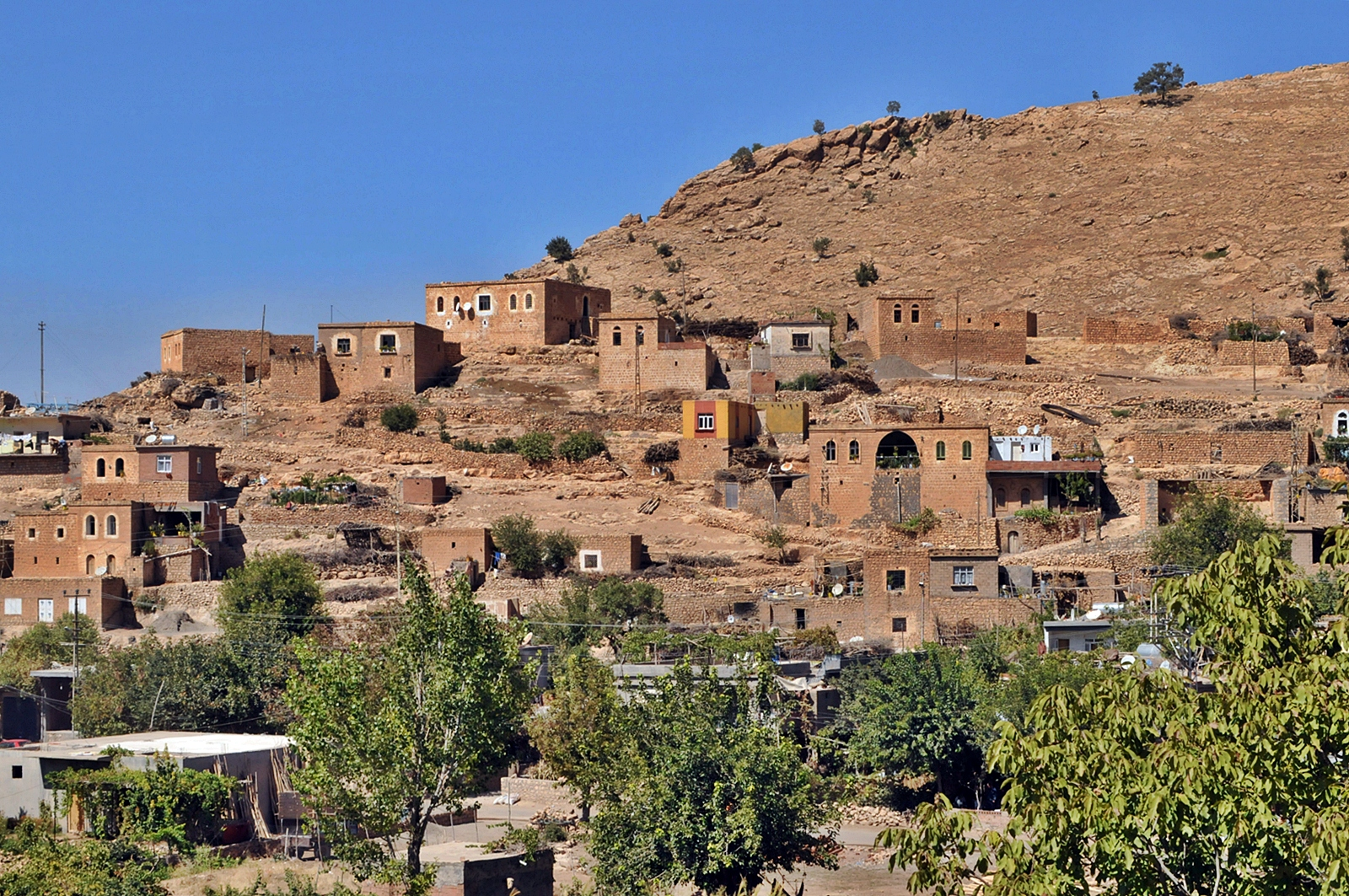

- Location within Turkey
- Coordinates: 37.581°N 40.737°E
- Country: Turkey
- Province: Mardin
- District: Savur
- Population (2022): 2,379
- Time zone: UTC+3 (TRT)

Sürgücü (Kurdish: Ewîna; Syriac: Awina) (Note: Alternatively transliterated as Avina, Avine, Avineh, Avinek, Avnié, Owena, or Uuéna.) is a neighbourhood of the municipality and district of Savur, Mardin Province, Turkey. Its population is 2,379 (2022). Before the 2013 reorganisation, it was a town (belde). It is populated by Kurds of the Surgucu tribe. It is located in the historic region of Tur Abdin.

== History ==
Awina (today called Sürgücü) was historically inhabited by Syriac Orthodox Christians. The kaza of Awina in the sanjak of Mardin in the Diyarbekir vilayet was named after the village although the administrative seat was at Savur. The Chaldean Catholic priest Joseph Tfinkdji estimated the village's population as 600 in 1914, including 60 Chaldean Catholics and Armenian Catholics, who did not have a priest, church, or school, whilst the rest of the population was Muslim. In 1914, it was populated by 100 Syriacs, as per the list presented to the Paris Peace Conference by the Assyro-Chaldean delegation. The Christians at Awina were massacred on 1 June 1915 amidst the Sayfo.

== Bibliography ==
- Barsoum, Aphrem (2008). The History of Tur Abdin. Translated by Matti Moosa. Gorgias Press.
- Courtois, Sébastien de (2004). The Forgotten Genocide: Eastern Christians, The Last Arameans. Translated by Vincent Aurora. Gorgias Press.
- Gaunt, David (2006). Massacres, Resistance, Protectors: Muslim-Christian Relations in Eastern Anatolia during World War I. Gorgias Press.
- Jongerden, Joost; Verheij, Jelle, eds. (2012). Social Relations in Ottoman Diyarbekir, 1870-1915. Brill.
- Tan, Altan (2018). Turabidin'den Berriye'ye. Aşiretler - Dinler - Diller - Kültürler (in Turkish). Pak Ajans Yayincilik Turizm Ve Diş Ticaret Limited şirketi. ISBN 9789944360944.
- Yacoub, Joseph (2016). Year of the Sword: The Assyrian Christian Genocide, A History. Translated by James Ferguson. Oxford University Press.
