= Şenocak, Savur =

Village in Mardin Province, Turkey

Şenocak
- Neighbourhood
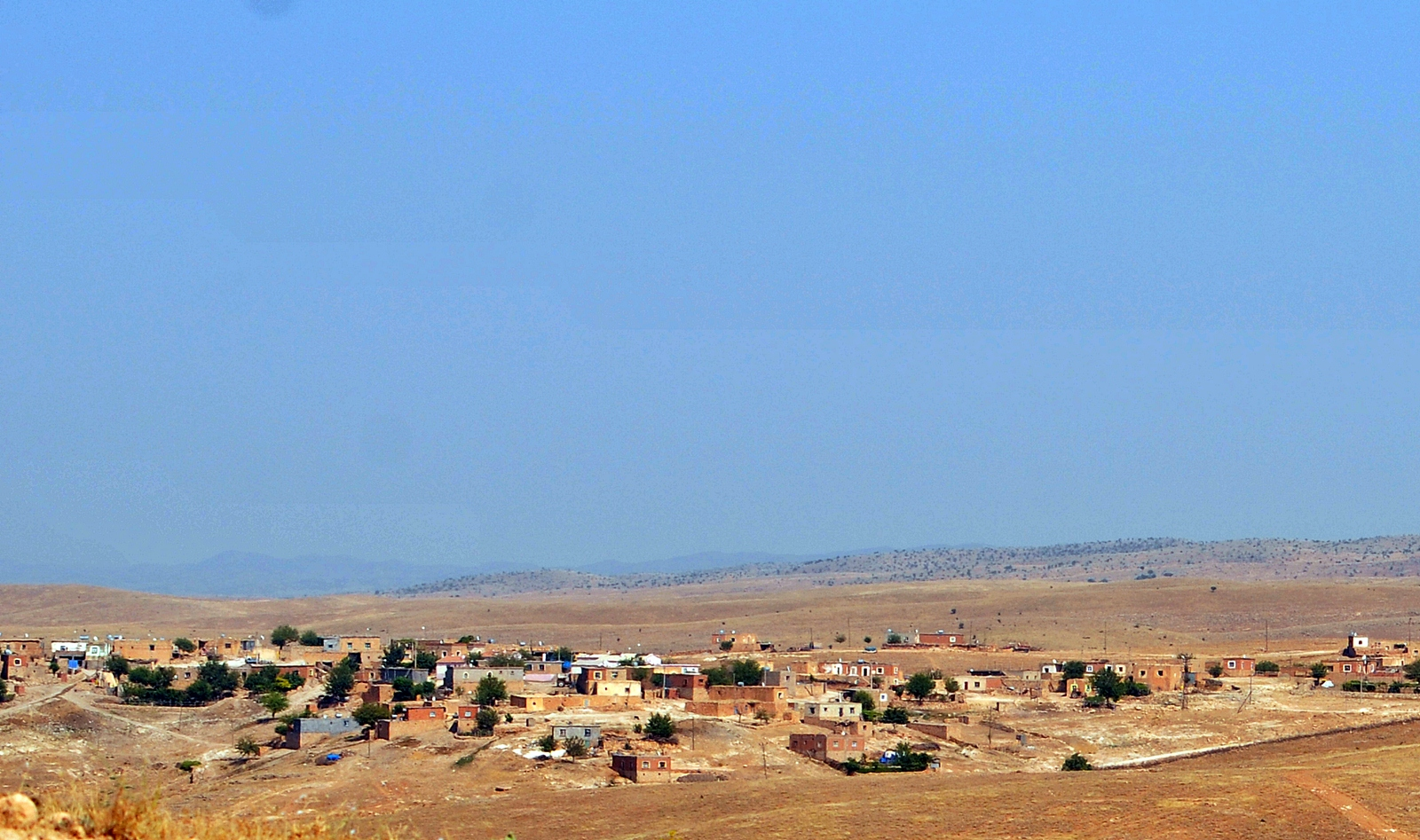

- Location within Turkey
- Coordinates: 37.649°N 40.693°E
- Country: Turkey
- Province: Mardin
- District: Savur
- Population (2021): 952
- Time zone: UTC+3 (TRT)

Şenocak (Kurdish: Şutê) is a neighbourhood in the municipality and district of Savur, Mardin Province in Turkey. The village is populated by Kurds of the Surgucu tribe and had a population of 952 in 2021.
