= Başağaç, Savur =

Village in Mardin Province, Turkey

Başağaç
- Neighbourhood
- Location in Turkey
- Coordinates: 37.619°N 41.012°E
- Country: Turkey
- Province: Mardin
- District: Savur
- Population (2021): 192
- Time zone: UTC+3 (TRT)

Başağaç (Kurdish: Siçwan) is a neighbourhood in the municipality and district of Savur, Mardin Province in Turkey. The village is populated by Kurds of the Dereverî tribe and had a population of 192 in 2021.
