= Bengisu, Savur =

Village in Mardin Province, Turkey

Bengisu
- Neighbourhood
- Location in Turkey
- Coordinates: 37.503°N 41.106°E
- Country: Turkey
- Province: Mardin
- District: Savur
- Population (2021): 276
- Time zone: UTC+3 (TRT)

Bengisu is a neighbourhood in the municipality and district of Savur, Mardin Province in Turkey. The village is populated by Arabs of the Kose tribe and had a population of 276 in 2021.
