= Gölbaşı, Savur =

Village in Mardin Province, Turkey

Gölbaşı
- Neighbourhood
- Location in Turkey
- Coordinates: 37.489°N 41.074°E
- Country: Turkey
- Province: Mardin
- District: Savur
- Population (2021): 265
- Time zone: UTC+3 (TRT)

Gölbaşı (Kurdish: Hirbahacı) (Note: Also spelt as Harabehacı, Hirbehacı, or Kherbé.) is a neighbourhood in the municipality and district of Savur, Mardin Province in Turkey. The village is populated by Arabs of the Kose tribe and had a population of 265 in 2021.

== History ==
Hirbahacı (today called Gölbaşı) was historically inhabited by Syriac Orthodox Christians. It was populated by 200 Syriacs in 1914, as per the list presented to the Paris Peace Conference by the Assyro-Chaldean delegation.

== Bibliography ==
- Gaunt, David (2006). Massacres, Resistance, Protectors: Muslim-Christian Relations in Eastern Anatolia during World War I. Gorgias Press.
- Jongerden, Joost; Verheij, Jelle, eds. (2012). Social Relations in Ottoman Diyarbekir, 1870-1915. Brill.
- Tan, Altan (2018). Turabidin'den Berriye'ye. Aşiretler - Dinler - Diller - Kültürler (in Turkish). Pak Ajans Yayincilik Turizm Ve Diş Ticaret Limited şirketi. ISBN 9789944360944.
