= Evkuran, Savur =

Village in Mardin Province, Turkey

Evkuran
- Neighbourhood
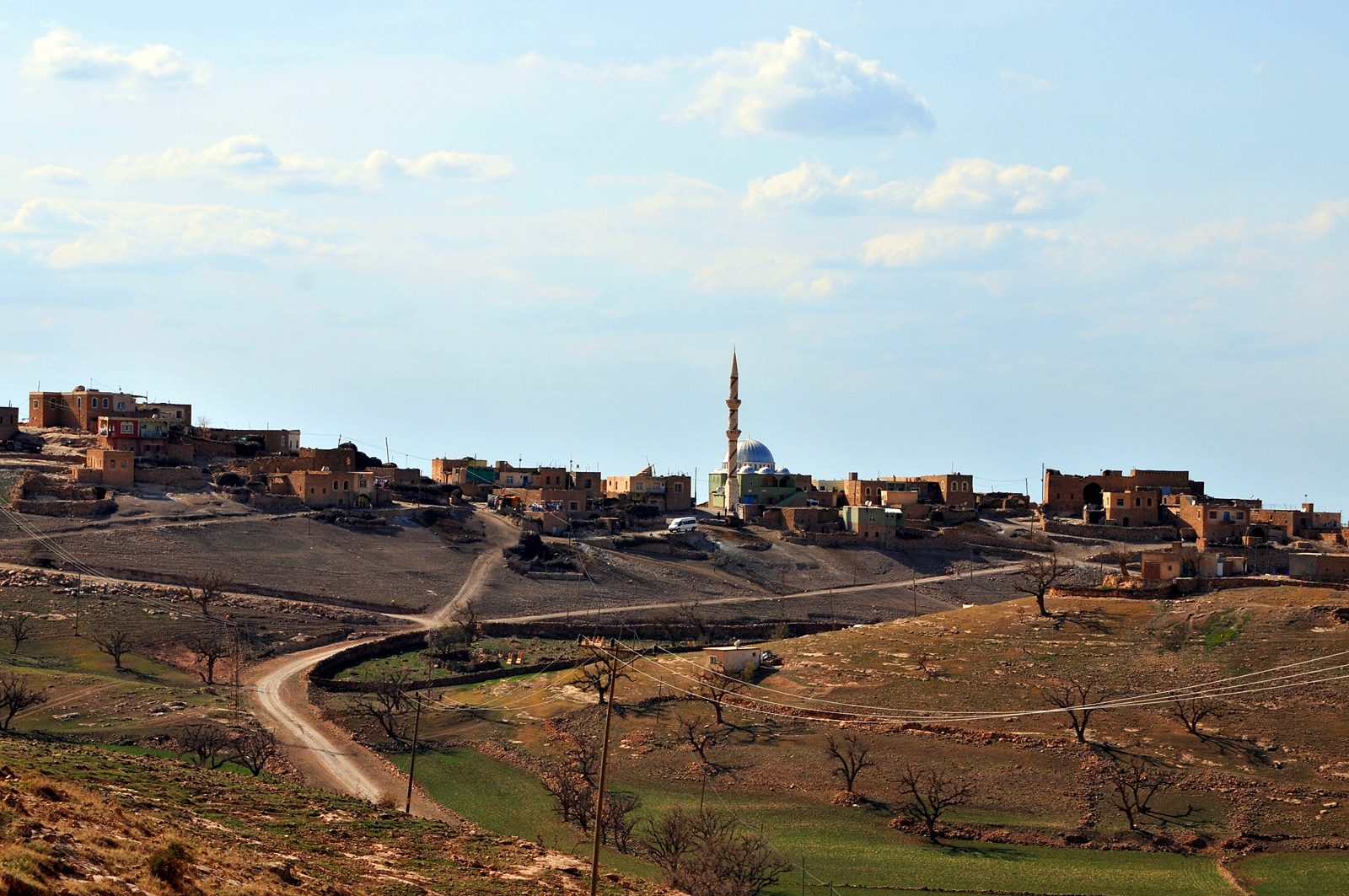

- Location within Turkey
- Coordinates: 37.660°N 40.965°E
- Country: Turkey
- Province: Mardin
- District: Savur
- Population (2021): 414
- Time zone: UTC+3 (TRT)

Evkuran (Kurdish: Dêrslav) is a neighbourhood in the municipality and district of Savur, Mardin Province in Turkey. The village is populated by Kurds of the Dereverî tribe and had a population of 414 in 2021.
