= İçören, Savur =

Village in Mardin Province, Turkey

İçören
- Neighbourhood
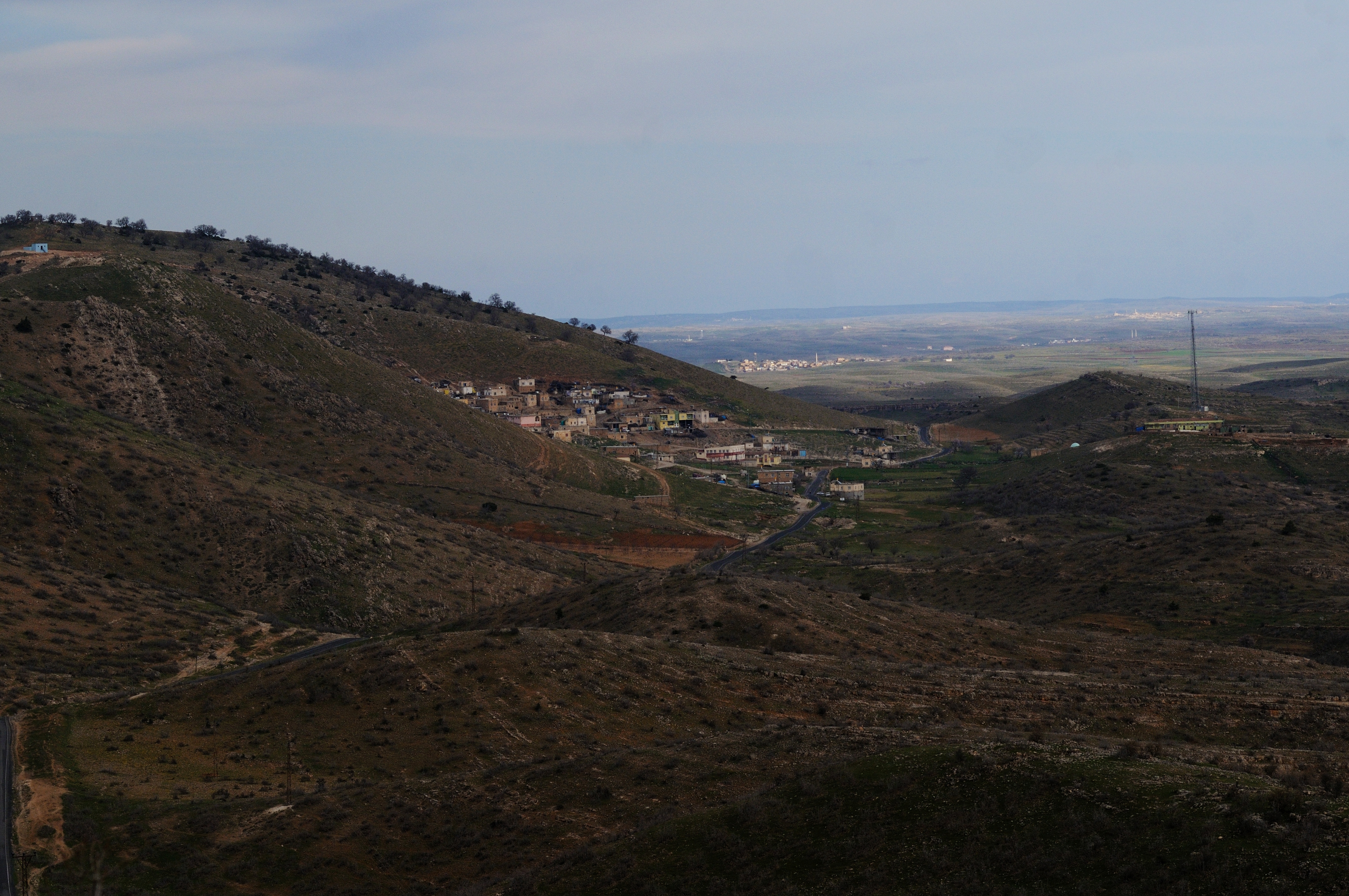

- Location within Turkey
- Coordinates: 37.558°N 41.096°E
- Country: Turkey
- Province: Mardin
- District: Savur
- Population (2021): 1,037
- Time zone: UTC+3 (TRT)

İçören or Teffe (Kurdish: Teffê) is a neighbourhood in the municipality and district of Savur, Mardin Province in Turkey. The village had a population of 1,037 in 2021.

It is populated by Arabs who are part of the adjacent Kurdish Dereverî tribe.
