= Hisarkaya, Savur =

Village in Mardin Province, Turkey

Hisarkaya
- Neighbourhood
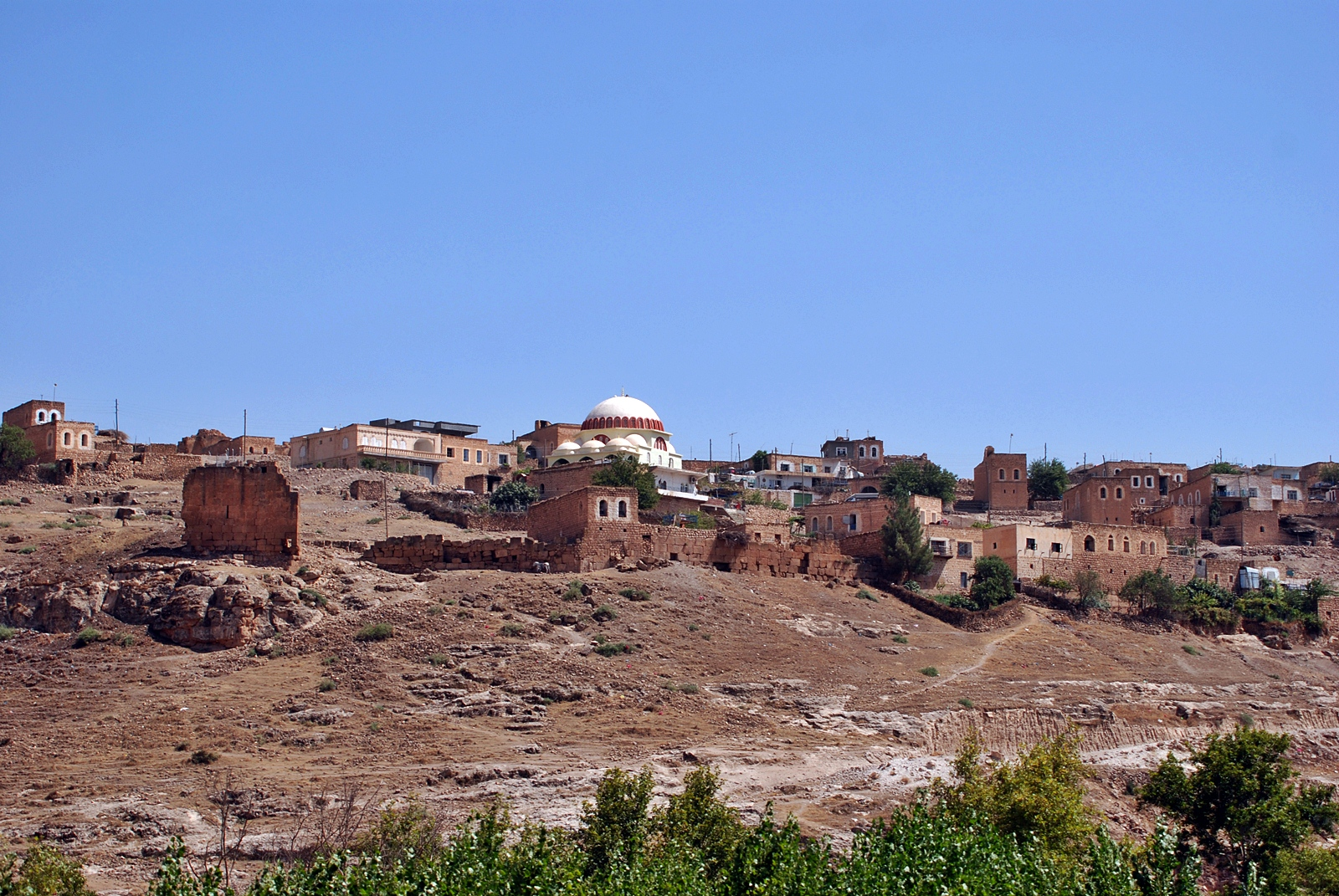

- Location within Turkey
- Coordinates: 37.643°N 40.908°E
- Country: Turkey
- Province: Mardin
- District: Savur
- Population (2021): 212
- Time zone: UTC+3 (TRT)

Hisarkaya (Kurdish: Kela Pozreş) is a neighbourhood in the municipality and district of Savur, Mardin Province in Turkey. The village is populated by Kurds of the Dereverî tribe and had a population of 212 in 2021.
