= Kırkdirek, Savur =

Village in Mardin Province, Turkey

Kırkdirek
- Neighbourhood
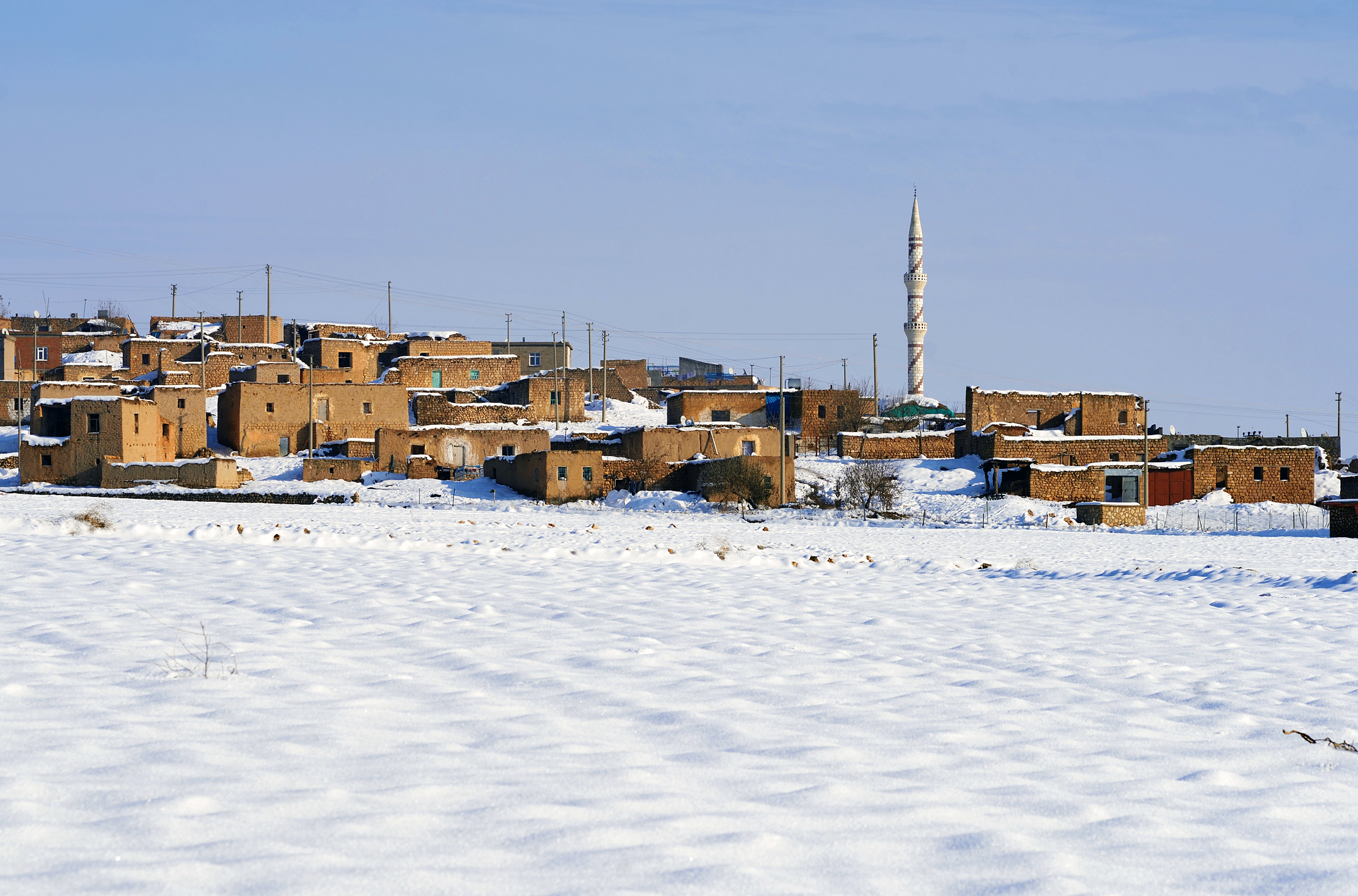

- Location within Turkey
- Coordinates: 37.675°N 40.727°E
- Country: Turkey
- Province: Mardin
- District: Savur
- Population (2021): 289
- Time zone: UTC+3 (TRT)

Kırkdirek (Kurdish: Çilstûn or Kirdilek) (Note: Also spelt as Coordirek, Kordilek, Kordilik, or Kirdirek.) is a neighbourhood in the municipality and district of Savur, Mardin Province in Turkey. The village is populated by Kurds of the Surgucu tribe and had a population of 289 in 2021.

== History ==
Kirdilek (today called Kırkdirek) was historically inhabited by Syriac Orthodox Christians. There were also some Catholics. There were ten Armenian families at Kirdilek when it was visited by Reverend George Percy Badger in 1850. It was populated by 100 Syriacs in 1914, according to the list presented to the Paris Peace Conference by the Assyro-Chaldean delegation.

== Bibliography ==
- Badger, George Percy (1852). The Nestorians and Their Rituals: With the Narrative of a Mission to Mesopotamia and Coordistan in 1842-1844, and of a Late Visit to Those Countries in 1850; Also, Researches Into the Present Condition of the Syrian Jacobites, Papal Syrians, and Chaldeans, and an Inquiry Into the Religious Tenets of the Yezeedees. Vol. 1.
- Courtois, Sébastien de (2004). The Forgotten Genocide: Eastern Christians, The Last Arameans. Translated by Vincent Aurora. Gorgias Press.
- Gaunt, David (2006). Massacres, Resistance, Protectors: Muslim-Christian Relations in Eastern Anatolia during World War I. Gorgias Press.
- Jongerden, Joost; Verheij, Jelle, eds. (2012). Social Relations in Ottoman Diyarbekir, 1870-1915. Brill.
- Tan, Altan (2018). Turabidin'den Berriye'ye. Aşiretler - Dinler - Diller - Kültürler (in Turkish). Pak Ajans Yayincilik Turizm Ve Diş Ticaret Limited şirketi. ISBN 9789944360944.
