= Üçkavak, Savur =

Village in Mardin Province, Turkey

Üçkavak
- Neighbourhood
- Location in Turkey
- Coordinates: 37.495°N 40.970°E
- Country: Turkey
- Province: Mardin
- District: Savur
- Population (2021): 1,155
- Time zone: UTC+3 (TRT)

Üçkavak is a neighbourhood in the municipality and district of Savur, Mardin Province in Turkey. The village is populated by Arabs of the Kose tribe and Kurds from various tribal affiliations. It had a population of 1,155 in 2021.
