= Harmantepe, Savur =

Village in Mardin Province, Turkey

Harmantepe
- Neighbourhood
- Location in Turkey
- Coordinates: 37.701°N 41.008°E
- Country: Turkey
- Province: Mardin
- District: Savur
- Population (2021): 498
- Time zone: UTC+3 (TRT)

Harmantepe (Kurdish: Xerab Memo) is a neighbourhood in the municipality and district of Savur, Mardin Province in Turkey. The village is populated by Kurds of the Dereverî tribe and had a population of 498 in 2021.
