= Yenilmez, Savur =

Village in Mardin Province, Turkey

Yenilmez
- Neighbourhood
- Location in Turkey
- Coordinates: 37.509°N 40.991°E
- Country: Turkey
- Province: Mardin
- District: Savur
- Population (2021): 452
- Time zone: UTC+3 (TRT)

Yenilmez is a neighbourhood in the municipality and district of Savur, Mardin Province in Turkey. The village is populated by Arabs of the Kose tribe and had a population of 452 in 2021.
