= Yazır, Savur =

Village in Mardin Province, Turkey

Yazır
- Neighbourhood
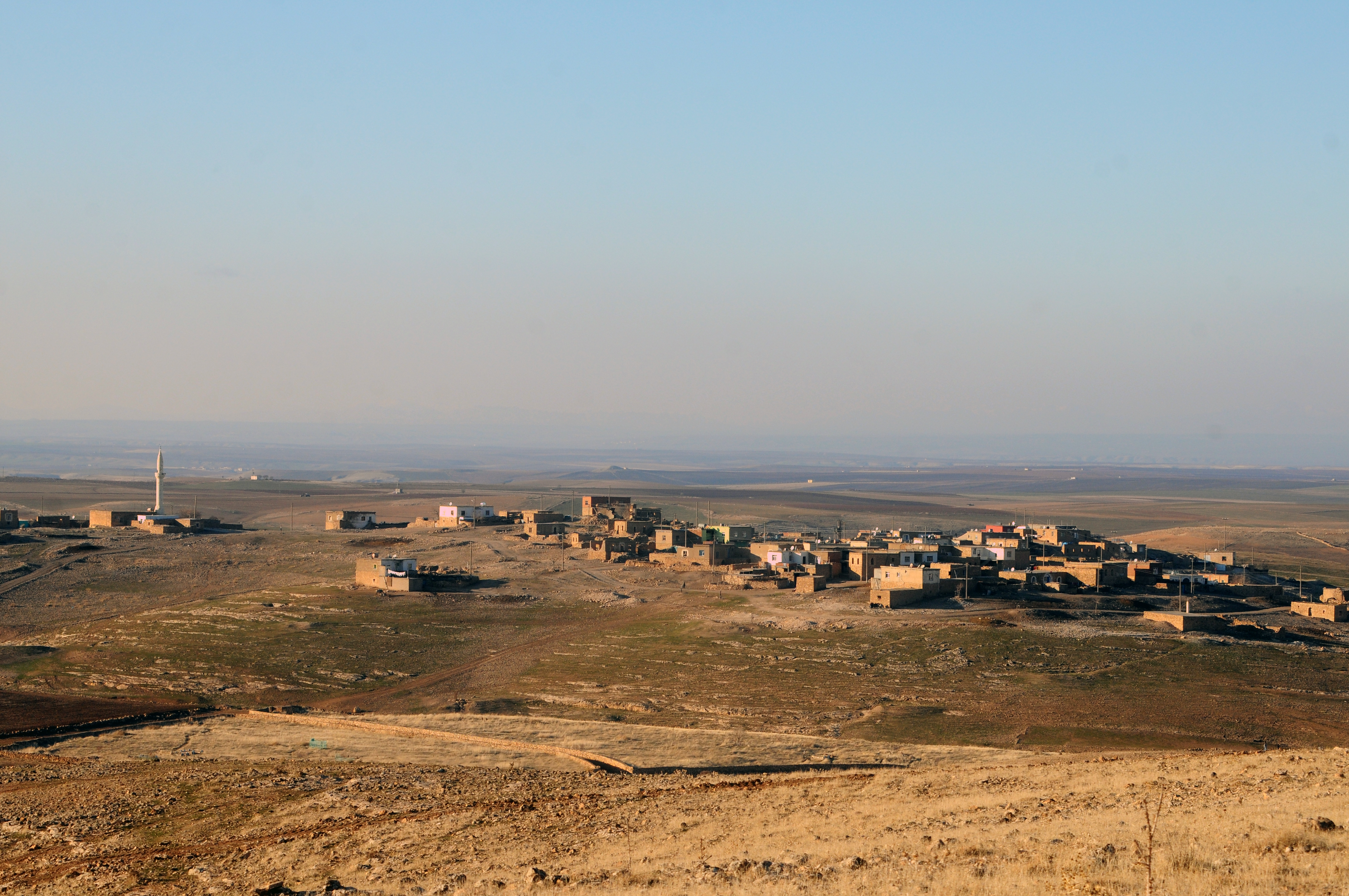

- Location within Turkey
- Coordinates: 37.645°N 40.787°E
- Country: Turkey
- Province: Mardin
- District: Savur
- Population (2021): 383
- Time zone: UTC+3 (TRT)

Yazır (Kurdish: Qunzêrîp) is a neighbourhood in the municipality and district of Savur, Mardin Province in Turkey. The village is populated by Kurds of the Surgucu tribe and had a population of 383 in 2021.
