= Başkavak, Savur =

Village in Mardin Province, Turkey

Başkavak
- Neighbourhood
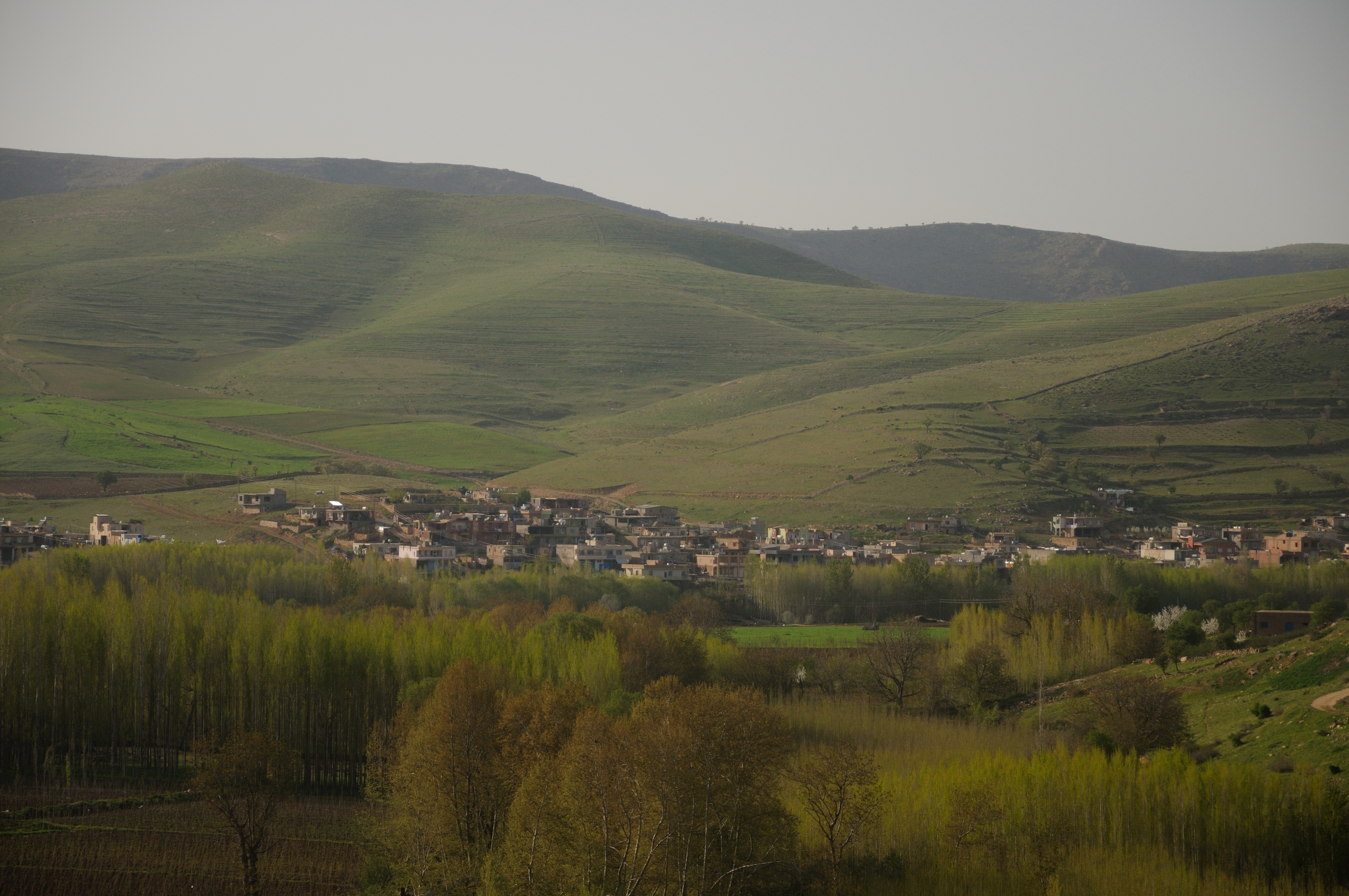

- Location within Turkey
- Coordinates: 37.567°N 40.891°E
- Country: Turkey
- Province: Mardin
- District: Savur
- Population (2021): 2,014
- Time zone: UTC+3 (TRT)

Başkavak (Arabic: الأحمدي, Syriac: Aḥmadī) (Note: Also known as al-Ahmadi, Ahmadi, Aḥmedī, or Ahmediye.) is a neighbourhood in the municipality and district of Savur, Mardin Province in Turkey. The village is populated by Arabic-speaking Mhallami and had a population of 2,014 in 2021. Members of the Naqshbandi sayyid Beyt Hamidi family also reside in the village who maintain followers in nearby settlements. It is located in the historic region of Bēth Muḥallam in Tur Abdin.

== History ==
Aḥmadī (today called Başkavak) was historically inhabited by Syriac Orthodox Christians. A small church was built in the village by Yuhanna, metropolitan of Mardin (r. 1125–1165). Patriarch Ignatius Jacob I (r. 1510/1512–1517/1519) was born at Aḥmadī. 6 deacons were ordained for the Syriac Orthodox Church of the Mother of God at Aḥmadī in 1587 (AG 1898). The village's population converted to Islam in 1583 or c. 1609 to escape persecution.

== Bibliography ==
- Adak, Abdurrahman (2004). "Güneydoğu Anadolu'da Seyyidler" (PDF). Marife Dini Araştırmalar Dergisi. 4 (3): 383–395.
- Barsoum, Aphrem (2008a). History of the Za'faran Monastery. Translated by Matti Moosa. Gorgias Press.
- Barsoum, Aphrem (2008b). The History of Tur Abdin. Translated by Matti Moosa. Gorgias Press.
- Barsoum, Aphrem (2009). The Collected Historical Essays of Aphram I Barsoum. Vol. 1. Translated by Matti Moosa. Gorgias Press. Archived from the original on 14 October 2018.
- Bcheiry, Iskandar (2010). A List of Syriac Orthodox Ecclesiastic Ordinations from the Sixteenth and Seventeenth Century: The Syriac Manuscript of Hunt 444 (Syr 68 in Bodleian Library, Oxford). Gorgias Press.
- Şayır, Mehmet (2017). Mardin Arapça Diyalekti (in Turkish). Akdem Yayınları.
- Tan, Altan (2011). Turabidin'den Berriye'ye. Aşiretler - Dinler - Diller - Kültürler (in Turkish).
- Wießner, Gernot (1983). Christliche Kultbauten im Ṭūr ʻAbdīn (in German). Vol. II. Harrassowitz Verlag.
