= Soylu, Savur =

Village in Mardin Province, Turkey

Soylu
- Neighbourhood
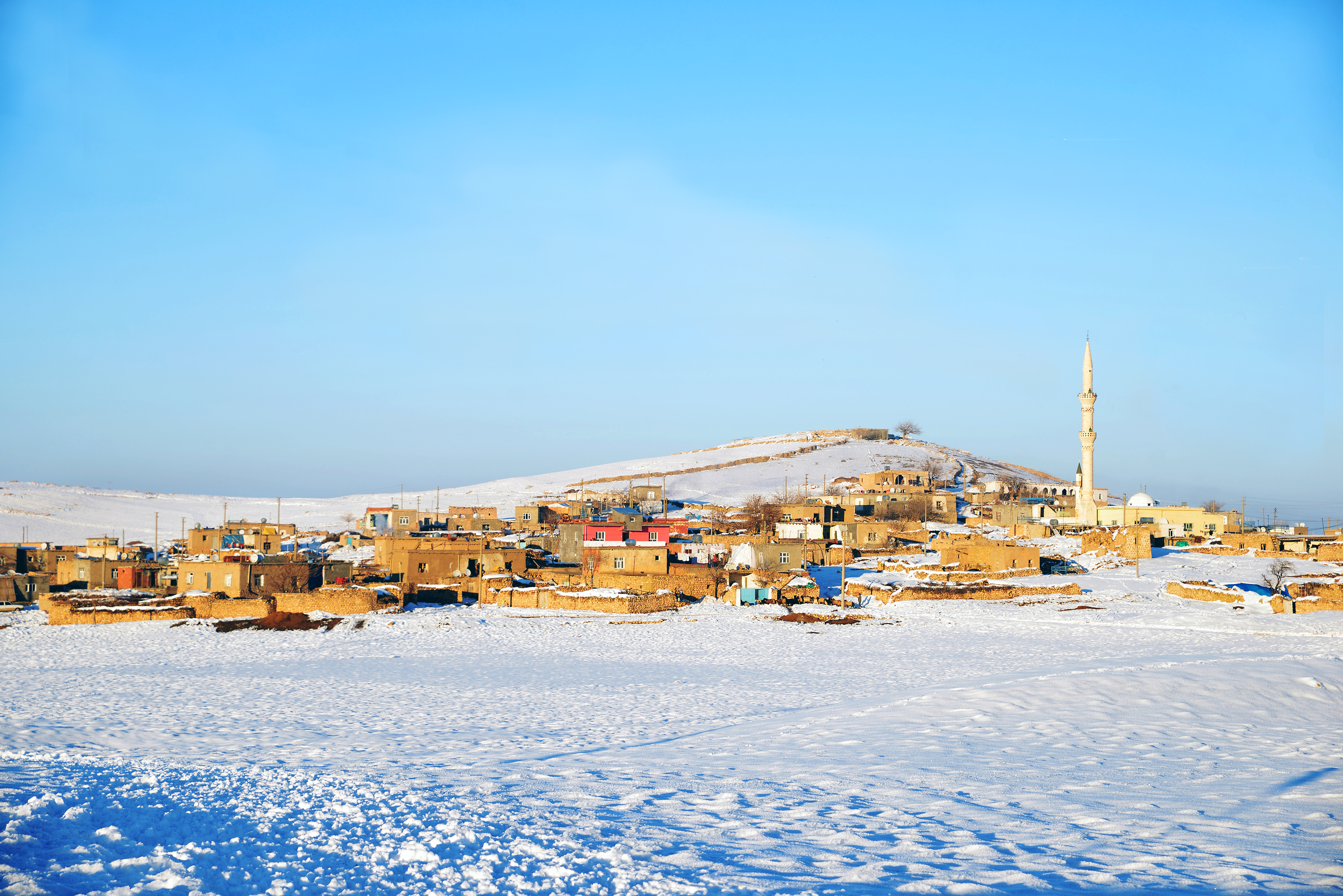

- Location within Turkey
- Coordinates: 37.650°N 40.817°E
- Country: Turkey
- Province: Mardin
- District: Savur
- Population (2021): 684
- Time zone: UTC+3 (TRT)

Soylu (Kurdish: Dêrîş) (Note: Also known as Derriš or Dereesh.) is a neighbourhood in the municipality and district of Savur, Mardin Province in Turkey. It is populated by Kurds of the Barava tribe and had a population of 684 in 2021. It is located in the historic region of Tur Abdin.

== History ==
Derriš (today called Soylu) was visited in 1850 by Reverend George Percy Badger, who noted the village was entirely inhabited by Muslim Kurds. The Chaldean Catholic priest Joseph Tfinkdji noted the village was also populated by Catholics in 1914.

== Bibliography ==
- Badger, George Percy (1852). The Nestorians and Their Rituals: With the Narrative of a Mission to Mesopotamia and Coordistan in 1842-1844, and of a Late Visit to Those Countries in 1850; Also, Researches Into the Present Condition of the Syrian Jacobites, Papal Syrians, and Chaldeans, and an Inquiry Into the Religious Tenets of the Yezeedees. Vol. 1.
- Courtois, Sébastien de (2004). The Forgotten Genocide: Eastern Christians, The Last Arameans. Translated by Vincent Aurora. Gorgias Press.
- Tan, Altan (2018). Turabidin'den Berriye'ye. Aşiretler - Dinler - Diller - Kültürler (in Turkish). Pak Ajans Yayincilik Turizm Ve Diş Ticaret Limited şirketi. ISBN 9789944360944.
- Wießner, Gernot (1993). Christliche Kultbauten im Ṭūr ʻAbdīn (in German). Vol. IV. Harrassowitz Verlag.
