= İşgören, Savur =

Village in Mardin Province, Turkey

İşgören
- Neighbourhood
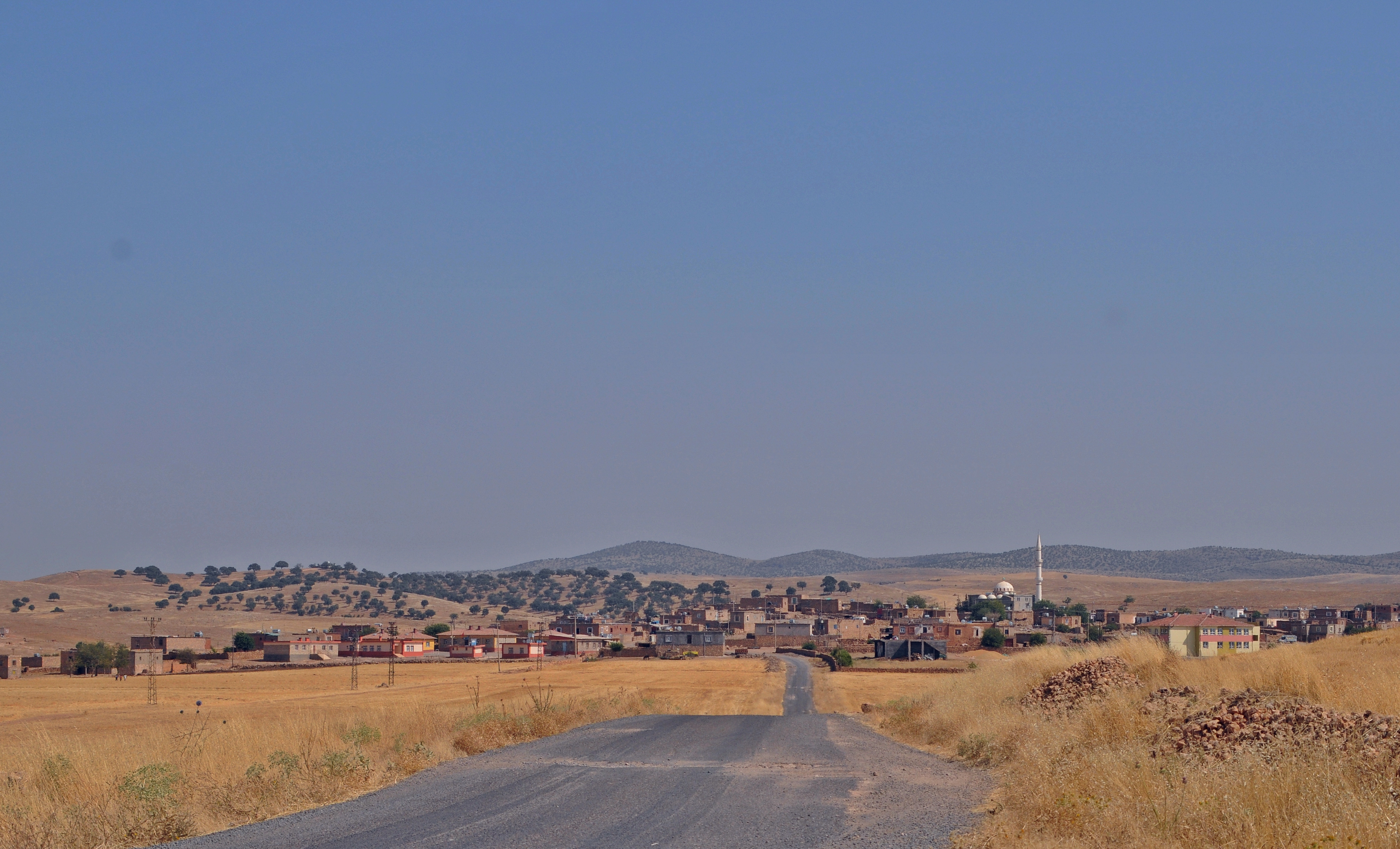

- Location within Turkey
- Coordinates: 37.656°N 40.658°E
- Country: Turkey
- Province: Mardin
- District: Savur
- Population (2021): 1,037
- Time zone: UTC+3 (TRT)

İşgören (Kurdish: Qewsan) is a neighbourhood in the municipality and district of Savur, Mardin Province in Turkey. It is populated by Kurds of the Surgucu tribe and had a population of 1,037 in 2021.
