= Pınardere, Savur =

Village in Mardin Province, Turkey

Pınardere
- Neighbourhood
- Location in Turkey
- Coordinates: 37.473°N 40.834°E
- Country: Turkey
- Province: Mardin
- District: Savur
- Population (2022): 1,764
- Time zone: UTC+3 (TRT)

Pınardere (Kurdish: Elfan) is a neighbourhood of the municipality and district of Savur, Mardin Province, Turkey. Its population is 1,764 (2022). Before the 2013 reorganisation, it was a town (belde). It is populated by Kurds of the Surgucu tribe.
