= Savur =

- District and municipality
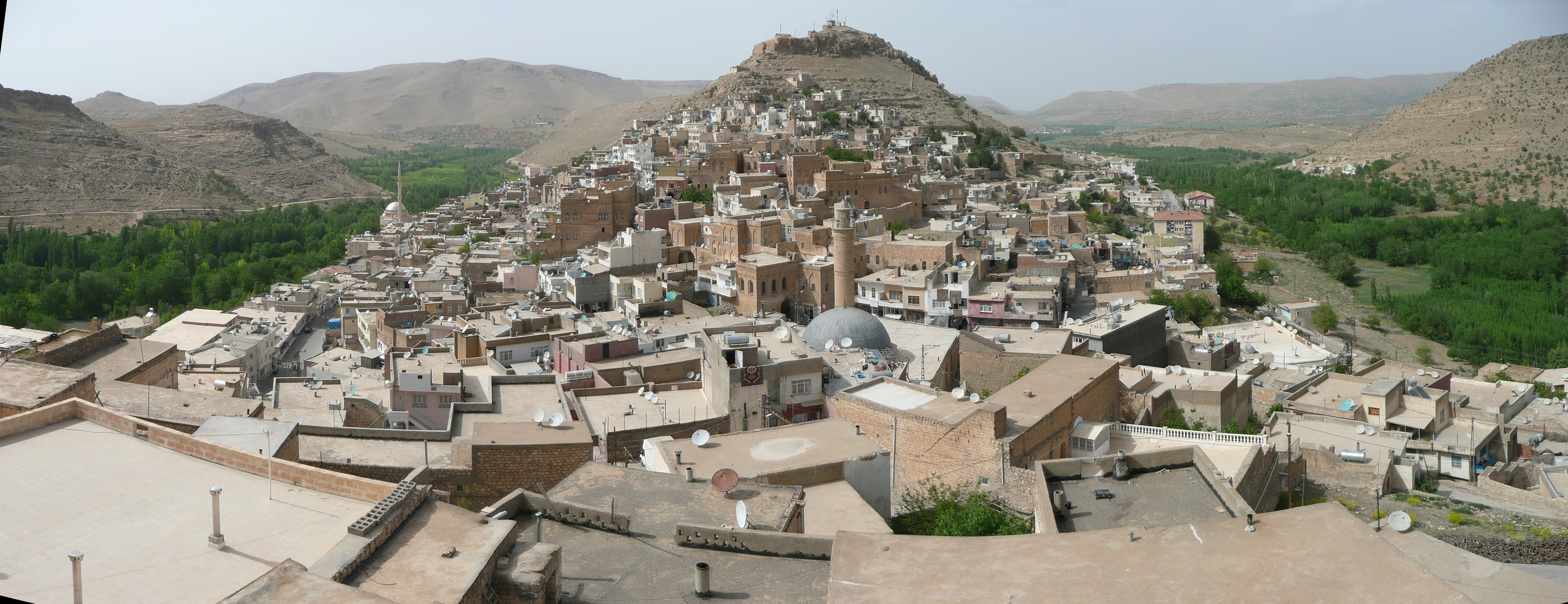

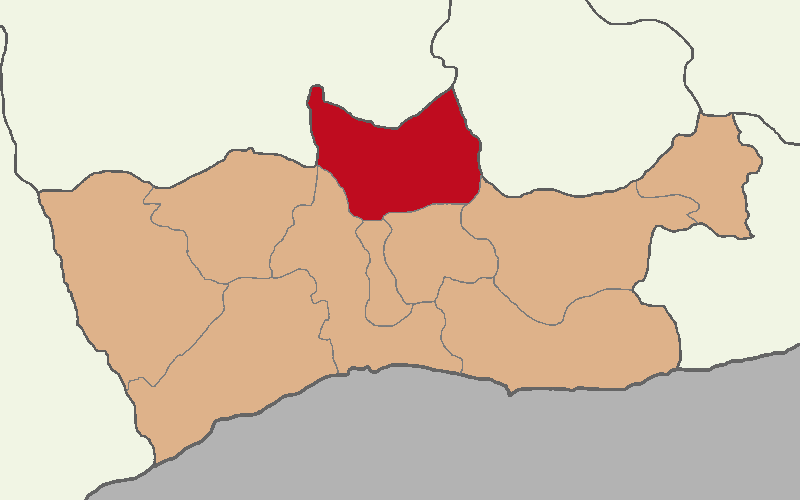
- Map showing Savur District in Mardin Province

- Location within Turkey
- Coordinates: 37°32′15″N 40°53′21″E
- Country: Turkey
- Province: Mardin
- Area: 962 km^{2} (371 sq mi)
- Population (2022): 24,821
  - Density: 25.8/km^{2} (66.8/sq mi)
- Time zone: UTC+3 (TRT)
- Area code: 0482
- Website: www.savur.bel.tr

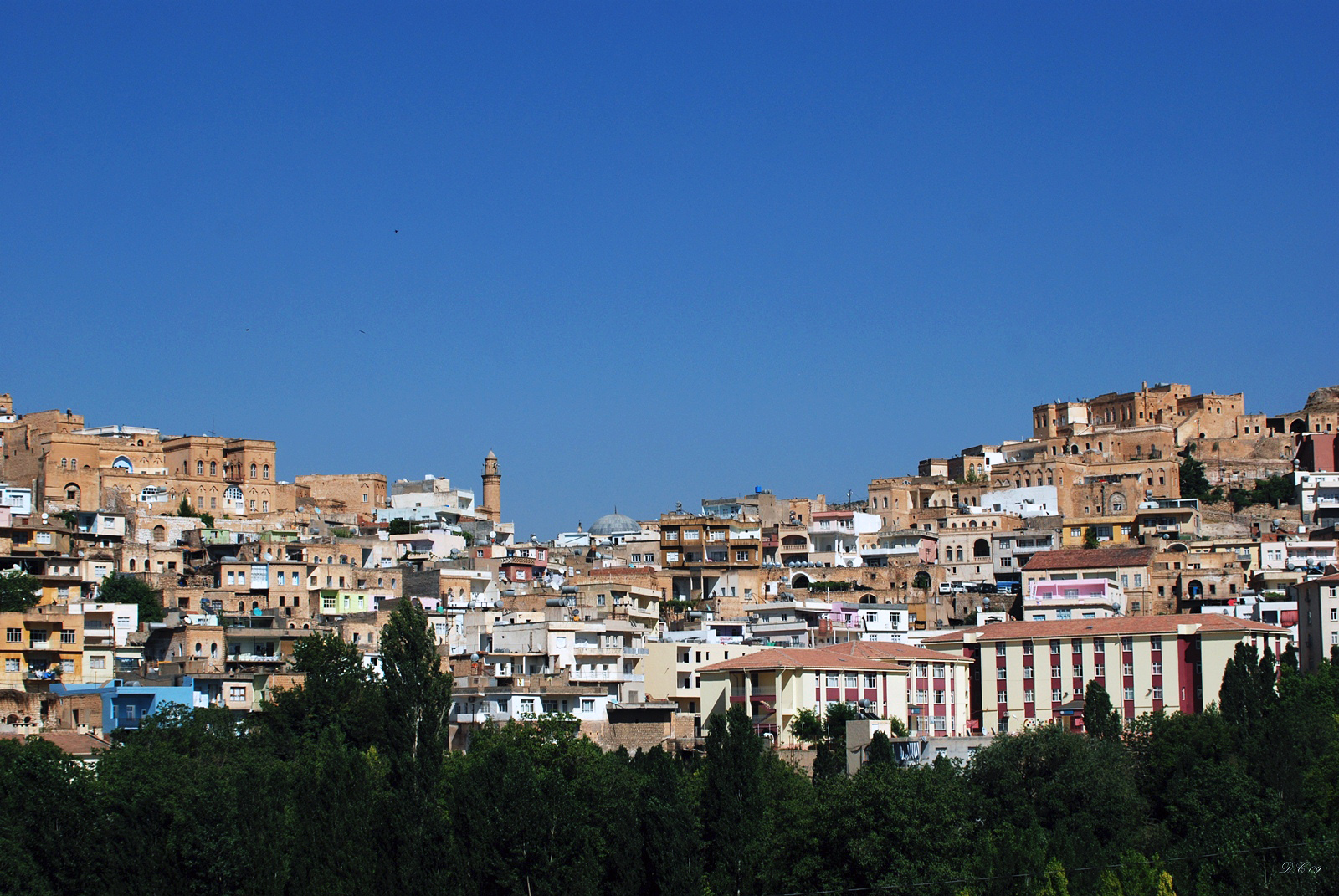
Savur

Savur (Syriac: ܨܰܘܪܳܐ, romanized: Ṣawro; Arabic: صور, romanized: Ṣawr; Kurdish: Stewr), meaning “mountain ridge” in Syriac and formerly known as Savor, is a municipality and district of Mardin Province, Turkey. Its area is 962 km^{2}, and its population is 24,821 (2022).

== Demographics ==
According to the Armenian Patriarchate of Constantinople, 1,032 lived in Savur on the eve of World War I. They had one church and two schools. They were massacred during the Armenian genocide. The Agha Petros mentions an Assyrian population of 200.

Mother tongue, Savur District, 1927 Turkish census
Turkish	Arabic	Kurdish	Circassian	Armenian	Unknown or other language
387	8,443	18,749	–	–	7

Religion, Savur District, 1927 Turkish census
Muslim	Christian	Jewish	Unknown or other religion
27,203	48	–	335

Today, the town is populated by Arabs, Assyrians and Kurds.

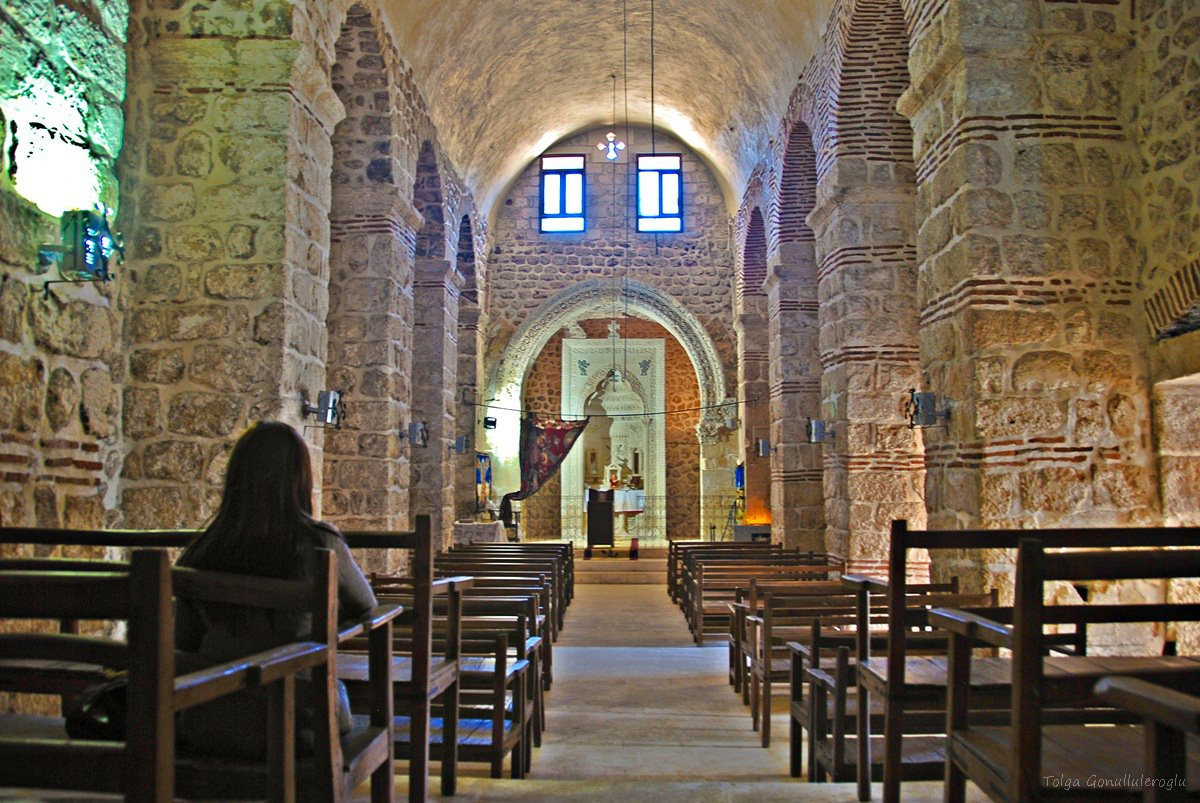
Syriac Orthodox Church of Mor Yuhanun

== Politics ==
In the local elections of March 2019, Gülistan Öncü of the pro-minority HDP was elected mayor. On 15 November 2019, she was detained due to an investigation related to terrorism. She was dismissed the following day, and District Governor Bayram Türker was appointed as a trustee.

== Composition ==
There are 41 neighbourhoods in Savur District:

- Akyürek (Menda)
- Armutalan (Zivinga Menda)
- Bağyaka (Bakustan)
- Başağaç (Siçwan)
- Başkavak (Ehmedî)
- Bengisu
- Çınarönü (Cilîn)
- Dereiçi (Qeleth)
- Durusu (Kunifir)
- Evkuran (Dêrslav)
- Gölbaşı
- Harmantepe (Xerab Memo)
- Hisarkaya (Kela Pozreş)
- İçören
- İşgören (Qewsan)
- Kaplan
- Karaköy (Xerabreş)
- Kayacıklar (Bazikê)
- Kayatepe (Mineyzil)
- Kırbalı (Qerbe)
- Kırkdirek (Çilstûn, Kirdilek)
- Kocahüyük (Sêgira, Qosê)
- Köprülü (Bakaysê)
- Koşuyolu
- Ormancık (Askêla)
- Pınardere (Elfan)
- Safa
- Sancaklı (Birîva)
- Şenocak (Şutê)
- Serenli (Dengizan)
- Seydin
- Soylu (Dêrîş)
- Sürgücü (Ewîna)
- Taşlık (Cirzê)
- Tokluca
- Üçerli (Dêrteyar)
- Üçkavak
- Yaylayanı (Memika)
- Yazır (Qunzêrîp)
- Yenilmez
- Yeşilalan (Barman)

== Notable people ==
- Aziz Sancar, Turkish scientist and second Turkish Nobel laureate
