= Çınarönü, Savur =

Village in Mardin Province, Turkey

Çınarönü
- Neighbourhood
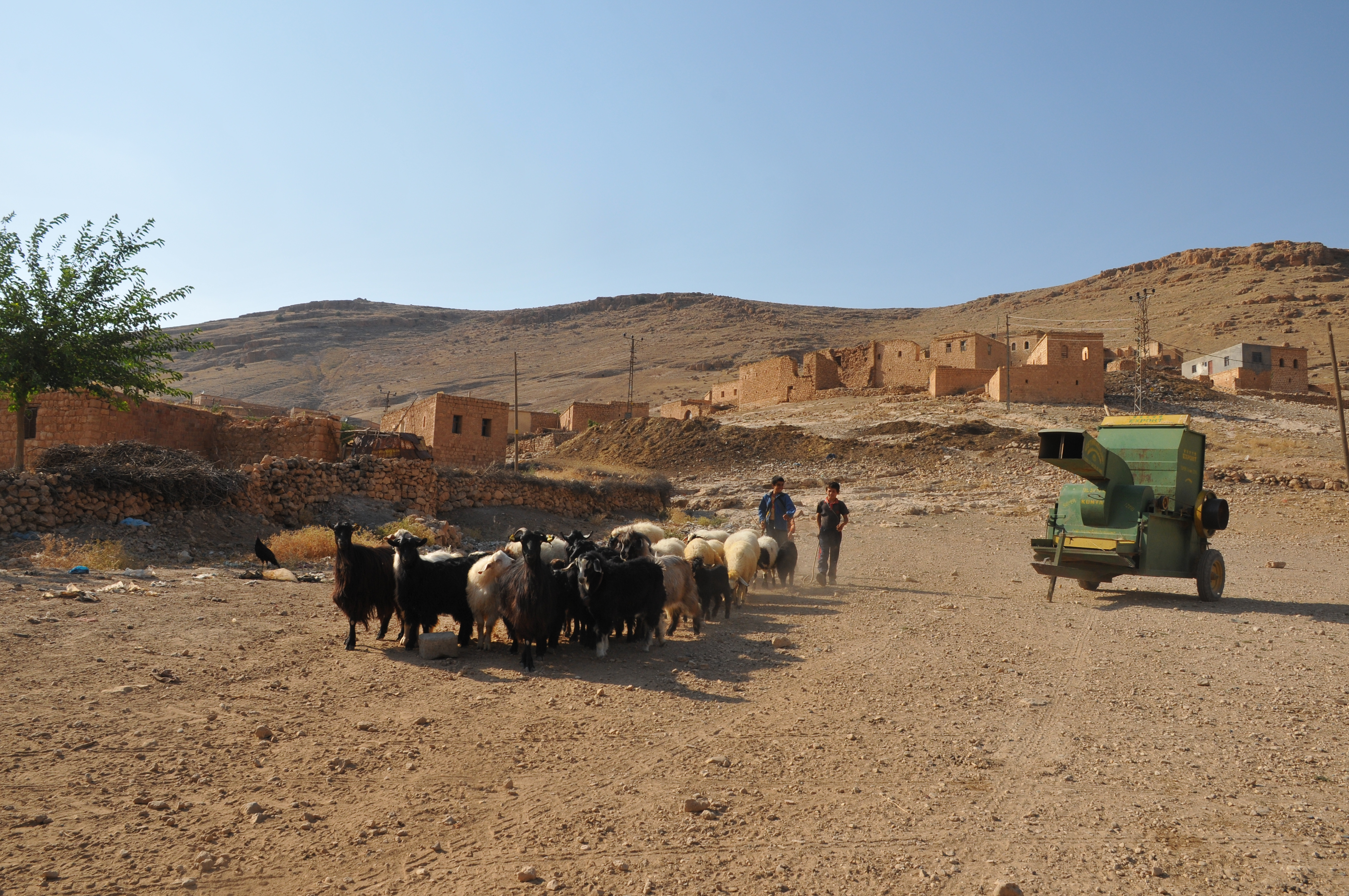

- Location within Turkey
- Coordinates: 37.595°N 40.682°E
- Country: Turkey
- Province: Mardin
- District: Savur
- Population (2021): 684
- Time zone: UTC+3 (TRT)

Çınarönü (Kurdish: Cilîn) is a neighbourhood in the municipality and district of Savur, Mardin Province in Turkey. The village is populated by Kurds of the Surgucu tribe and had a population of 684 in 2021.
