= Köprülü, Savur =

Village in Mardin Province, Turkey

Köprülü
- Neighbourhood
- Location in Turkey
- Coordinates: 37.468°N 40.866°E
- Country: Turkey
- Province: Mardin
- District: Savur
- Population (2021): 127
- Time zone: UTC+3 (TRT)

Köprülü (Kurdish: Bakaysê) is a neighbourhood in the municipality and district of Savur, Mardin Province in Turkey. The village is populated by Kurds of the Surgucu tribe and had a population of 127 in 2021.
