= Koşuyolu, Savur =

Village in Mardin Province, Turkey

Koşuyolu
- Neighbourhood
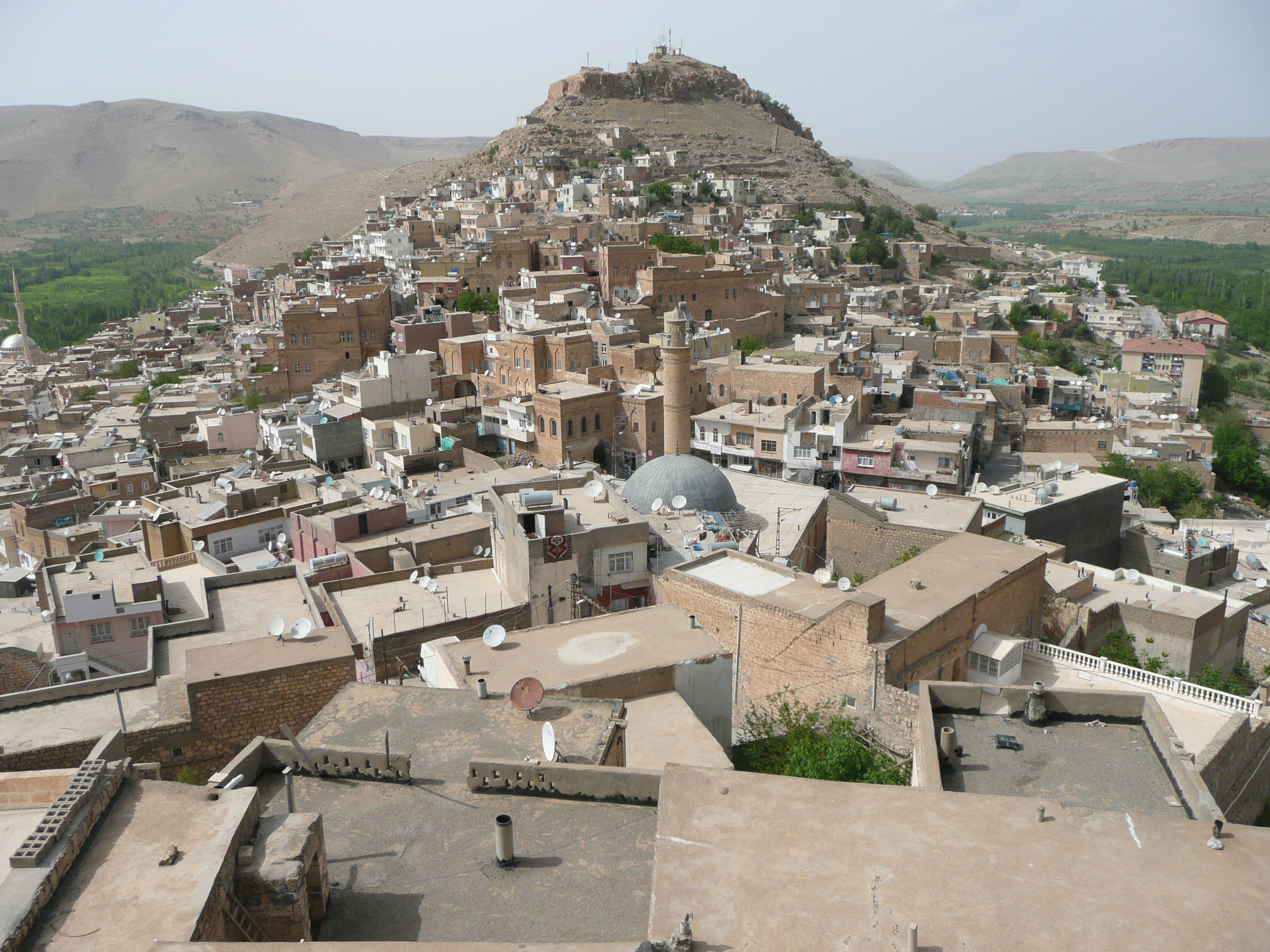
- Koşuyolu in 2008

- Location within Turkey
- Coordinates: 37.490°N 41.028°E
- Country: Turkey
- Province: Mardin
- District: Savur
- Population (2021): 388
- Time zone: UTC+3 (TRT)

Koşuyolu or Erbil is a neighbourhood in the municipality and district of Savur, Mardin Province in Turkey. The village is populated by Arabs of the Kose tribe and had a population of 388 in 2021.
