= Taşlık, Savur =

Village in Mardin Province, Turkey

Taşlık
- Neighbourhood
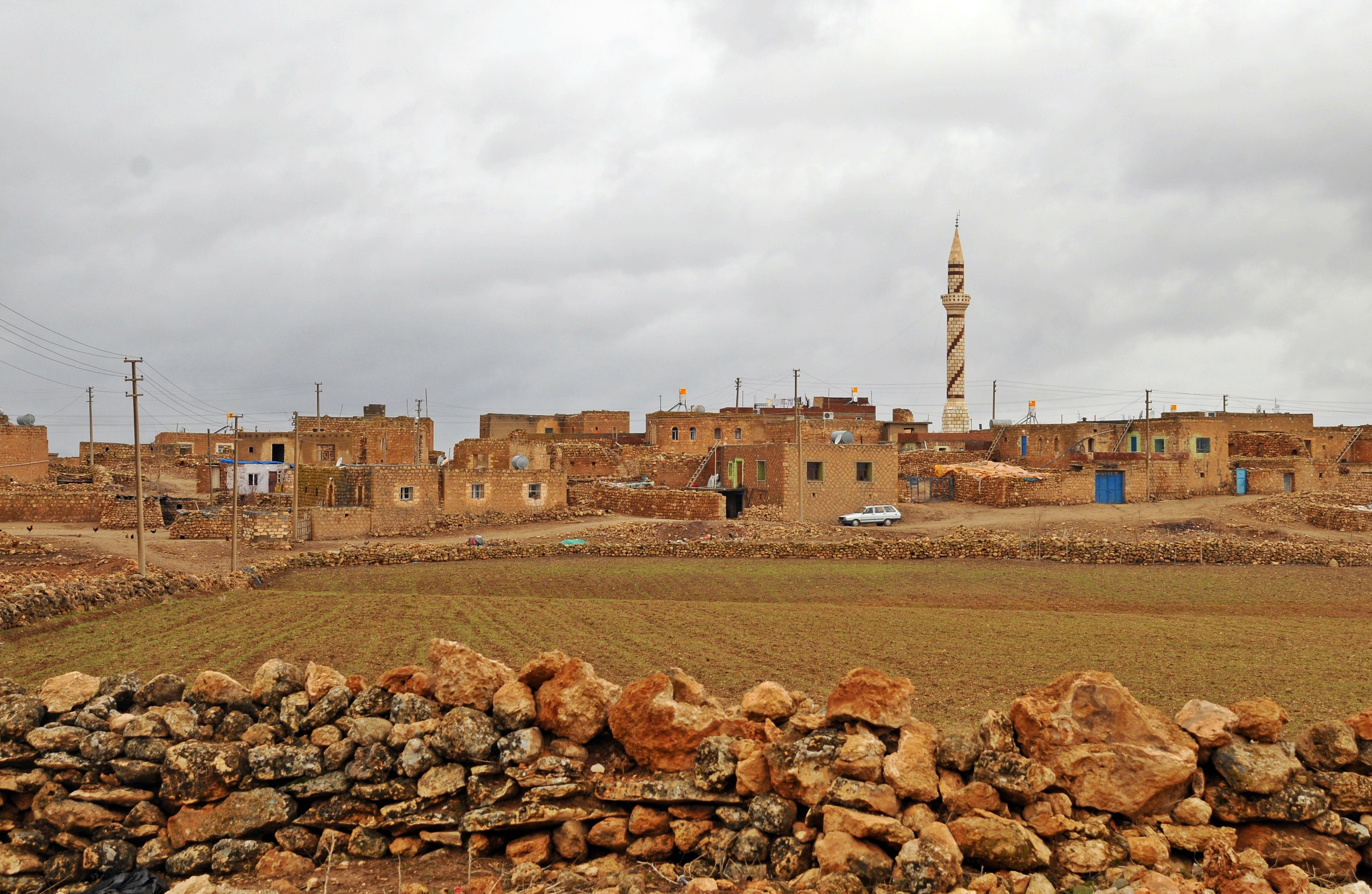

- Location within Turkey
- Coordinates: 37.655°N 40.755°E
- Country: Turkey
- Province: Mardin
- District: Savur
- Population (2021): 249
- Time zone: UTC+3 (TRT)

Taşlık (Kurdish: Cirzê) is a neighbourhood in the municipality and district of Savur, Mardin Province in Turkey. The village is populated by Kurds of the Surgucu tribe and had a population of 249 in 2021.
