= Armutalan, Savur =

Village in Mardin Province, Turkey

Armutalan
- Neighbourhood
- Location in Turkey
- Coordinates: 37.640°N 41.044°E
- Country: Turkey
- Province: Mardin
- District: Savur
- Population (2021): 100
- Time zone: UTC+3 (TRT)

Armutalan (Kurdish: Zivinga Mendan) is a neighbourhood in the municipality and district of Savur, Mardin Province in Turkey. The village is populated by Kurds of the Dereverî tribe and had a population of 100 in 2021.
