= Tokluca, Savur =

Village in Mardin Province, Turkey

Tokluca
- Neighbourhood
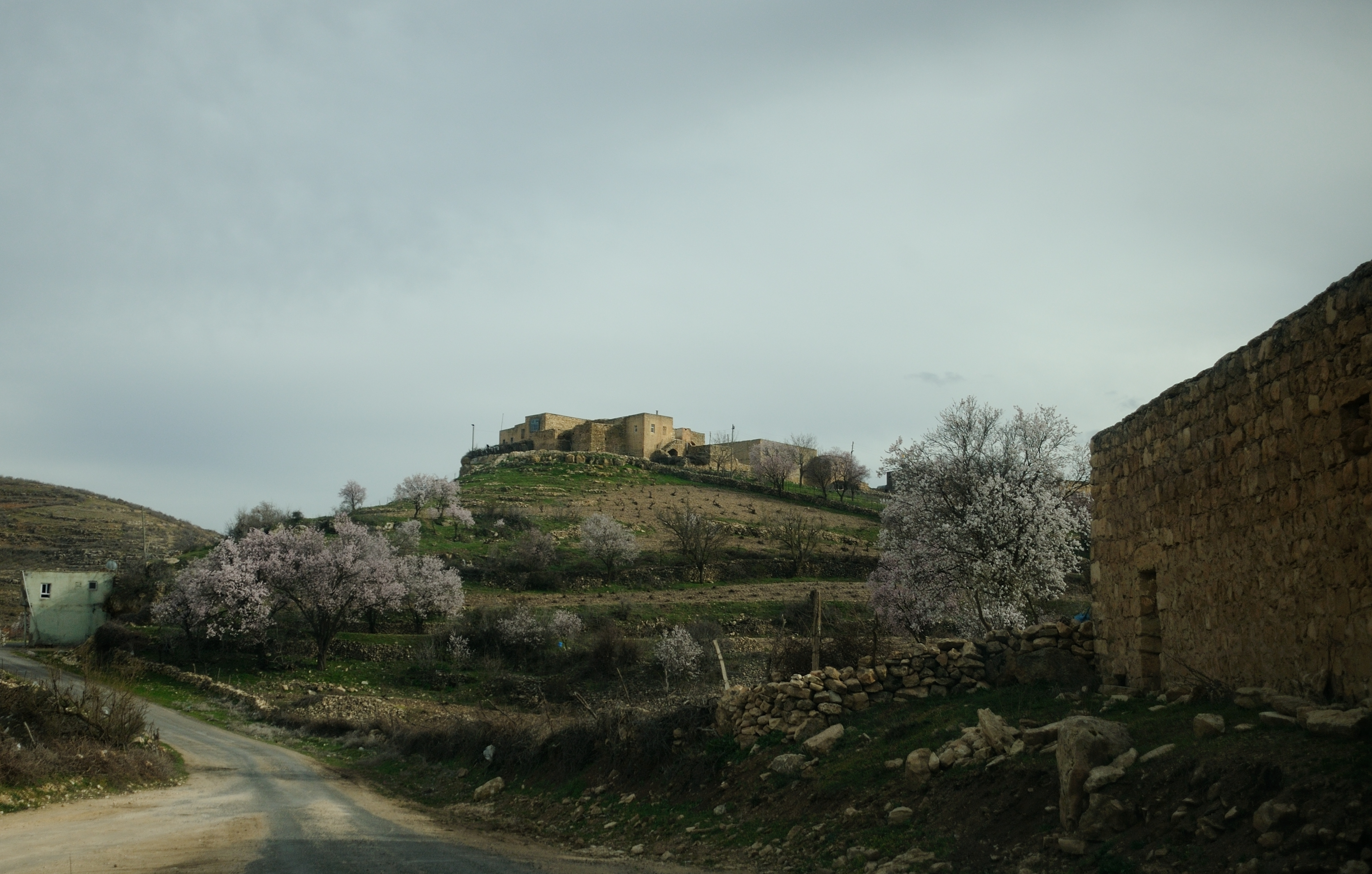

- Location within Turkey
- Coordinates: 37.584°N 41.038°E
- Country: Turkey
- Province: Mardin
- District: Savur
- Population (2021): 349
- Time zone: UTC+3 (TRT)

Tokluca or Cevze (Kurdish: Cewzê) is a neighbourhood in the municipality and district of Savur, Mardin Province in Turkey. Populated by Arabs who are part of the adjacent Kurdish Dereverî tribe, the village had a population of 349 in 2021. The hamlet of Mentera, which has a Kurdish population, is attached to the village.
