= Kocahüyük, Savur =

Village in Mardin Province, Turkey

Kocahüyük
- Neighbourhood
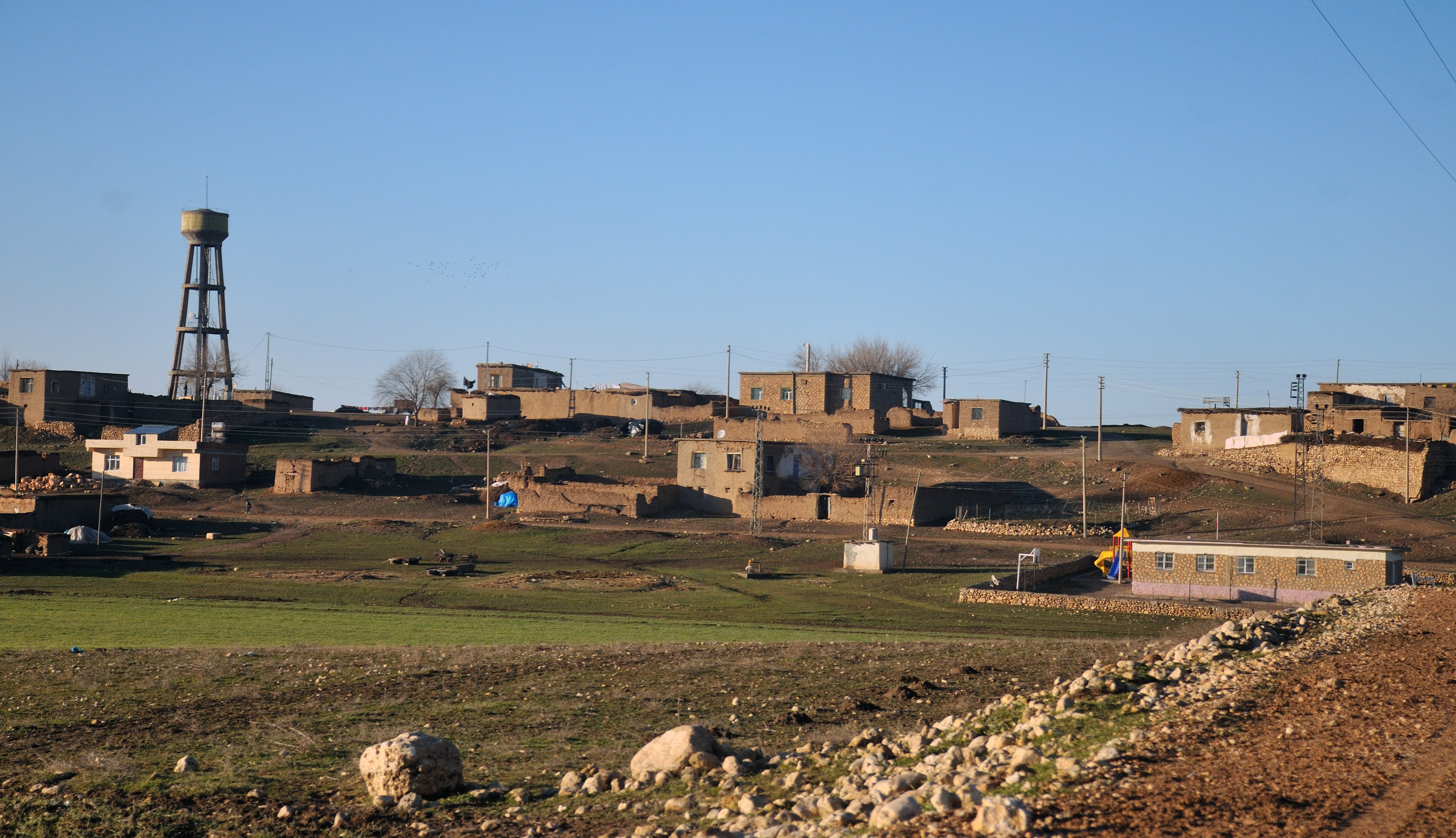

- Location within Turkey
- Coordinates: 37.727°N 40.668°E
- Country: Turkey
- Province: Mardin
- District: Savur
- Population (2021): 138
- Time zone: UTC+3 (TRT)

Kocahüyük (Kurdish: Sêgira, Qoşê) is a neighbourhood in the municipality and district of Savur, Mardin Province in Turkey. It is populated by Kurds of the Barava tribe and had a population of 138 in 2021.
