= Yeşilalan, Savur =

Village in Mardin Province, Turkey

Yeşilalan
- Neighbourhood
- Location in Turkey
- Coordinates: 37.463°N 40.787°E
- Country: Turkey
- Province: Mardin
- District: Savur
- Population (2022): 753
- Time zone: UTC+3 (TRT)

Yeşilalan (Kurdish: Barman) is a neighbourhood of the municipality and district of Savur, Mardin Province, Turkey. Its population is 753 (2022). Before the 2013 reorganisation, it was a town (belde). It is populated by Kurds of the Surgucu tribe.
