= Günəşli =

Günəşli or Güneşli or Güneşlı may refer to:

- Günəşli, Bilasuvar, Azerbaijan
- Günəşli, Davachi, Azerbaijan
- Günəşli, Gadabay, Azerbaijan
- Güneşli, Gönen, Turkey
- Güneşli, İnebolu, Turkey
- Günəşli, Jalilabad, Azerbaijan
- Günəşli, Kalbajar, Azerbaijan
- Günəşli, Khachmaz, Azerbaijan
- Günəşli, Khojavend, Azerbaijan
- Günəşli, Lerik, Azerbaijan
- Günəşli, Saatly, Azerbaijan
- Günəşli, Shamkir, Azerbaijan
- Güneşlı, Siazan, Azerbaijan
- Yeni Günəşli, Azerbaijan

== See also ==
- Güneyli (disambiguation)
