= Şurakənd =

Şurakənd or Shurakend may refer to:

- Şurakənd, Gadabay (disambiguation)
  - Günəşli (disambiguation), Azerbaijan
  - Şahdağ, Azerbaijan
- Şurakənd, Goranboy, Azerbaijan
- Şurakənd, Khizi, Azerbaijan
