= Meşəli =

Meşəli may refer to the following places in Azerbaijan:

- Meşəli, Goranboy, a village in Aşağı Ağcakənd
- Meşəli, Khachmaz, a village in Nabran
- Meşəli, Khojaly or Lesnoy, a village near Patara

== See also ==
- Meşeli (disambiguation), several places in Turkey
- Meseli, Republic of Bashkortostan, a rural locality in Russia
