= Meşeli =

Meşeli may refer to the following places in Turkey:

- Meşeli, Çubuk, a neighbourhood in Ankara Province
- Meşeli, Derik, a neighbourhood in Mardin Province
- Meşeli, Elâzığ, a village in Elazığ Province
- Meşeli, Germencik, a neighbourhood in Aydın Province
- Meşeli, Mazıdağı, a neighbourhood in Mardin Province
- Meşeli, Sason, a village in Batman Province
- Meşeli, Şavşat, a village in Artvin Province
- Meşeli, Uzunköprü, a village in Edirne Province
- Meşeli, Vezirköprü, a neighbourhood in Samsun Province

== See also ==
- Meşəli (disambiguation), several places in Azerbaijan
- Meseli, Republic of Bashkortostan, a rural locality in Russia
