= Bozdemir-Mazıdağı railway =

Railway in Turkey

Overview
- Native name: Bozdemir-Mazıdağı demiryolu
- Status: Operating
- Owner: Turkish State Railways
- Locale: Eastern Anatolia
- Termini: Bozdemir, Turkey; Mazıdağı, Turkey

Service
- Type: Heavy rail
- System: Turkish State Railways
- Operator(s): TCDD Taşımacılık; Körfez Ulaştırma

History
- Opened: 2022

Technical
- Line length: 53 km (33 mi)
- Number of tracks: Single track
- Track gauge: 1,435 mm (4 ft 8 1/2 in) standard gauge
- Electrification: no
- Operating speed: 100 km/h (62 mph)
- Signalling: manual (Telefonla Merkezden Idare)

The Bozdemir-Mazıdağı railway (Turkish: Bozdemir-Mazıdağı demiryolu) is a 53km freight railway to serve a metal factory and a phosphate fertilizer factory with a capacity of producing 400000t of fertilizers a year.

== Infrastructure and Route ==
The line starts at Bozdemir, a railway station on the Diyarbakır-Kurtalan railway. Bozdemir is located 14.3km away from Diyarbakır railway station. From Bozdemir, the line will turn south and cross the Tigris river on a 360m long bridge. Near the village of Yukarı Ortaören, the line turns west to enter a gorge and to climb to the factory which is located near the village of Kocakent, in the district of Mazıdağı. The line climbs from the altitude 560m at Bozdemir to the altitude of 1030m at the factory. This is an average climb of 8.4‰. The line has 5 tunnels for a cumulative length of 2829m. Most of them are cut and cover show sheds.

Bozdemir-Mazıdağı railway

The line is single track, standard gauge, with no passing sidings. It is not electrified and operated with diesel traction. The line is operated under manual signaling (Telefonla Merkezden Idare). The trains proceeds from station to station under written train orders transmitted by a line dispatcher.

The railway construction was started in 2018 and it was completed in March 2022

== Traffic ==
This line is freight only, having no passenger station along the way.

There is a proposal to extend this railway to connect with the railway from Gaziantep and Karkamış to Mardin.
