= Çiçəkli =

Çiçəkli (literally "with flowers" or "place with flowers") is an Azerbaijani place name and may refer to:

- Çiçəkli, Gədəbəy, formerly known as Arabachy
- Çiçəkli, Sabirabad

== See also ==
- Çiçekli (disambiguation)
