= Güneyli =

Güneyli may refer to:

- Güneyli, Erdemli, Turkey
- Güneyli, Gelibolu
- Güneyli, Jalilabad, Azerbaijan

== See also ==
- Güneli, Nusaybin, Mardin Province, Turkey
- Günəşli (disambiguation)
