= Şurakənd, Gadabay =

Şurakənd, Gadabay may refer to:

- Günəşli, Gadabay, Azerbaijan
- Şahdağ, Azerbaijan
