= Hesen Begê Cemetery =

Yazidi cemetery in southeastern Turkey

Coordinates: 37.1566667°N 41.5444444°E

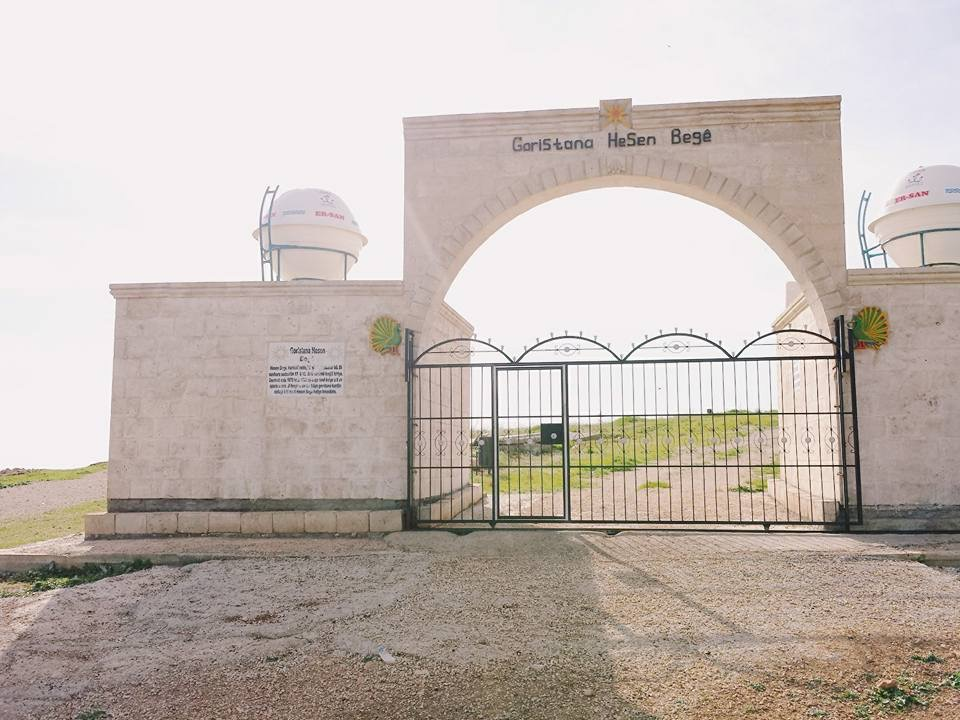
The entrance to the Yazidi cemetery of Hesen Begê

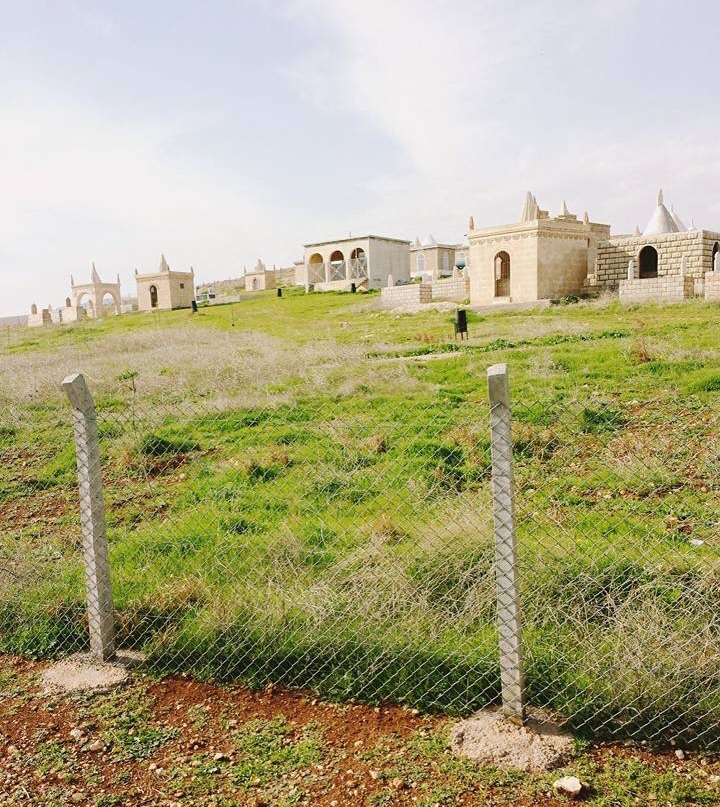
Yazidi graves in the Hesen Begê cemetery

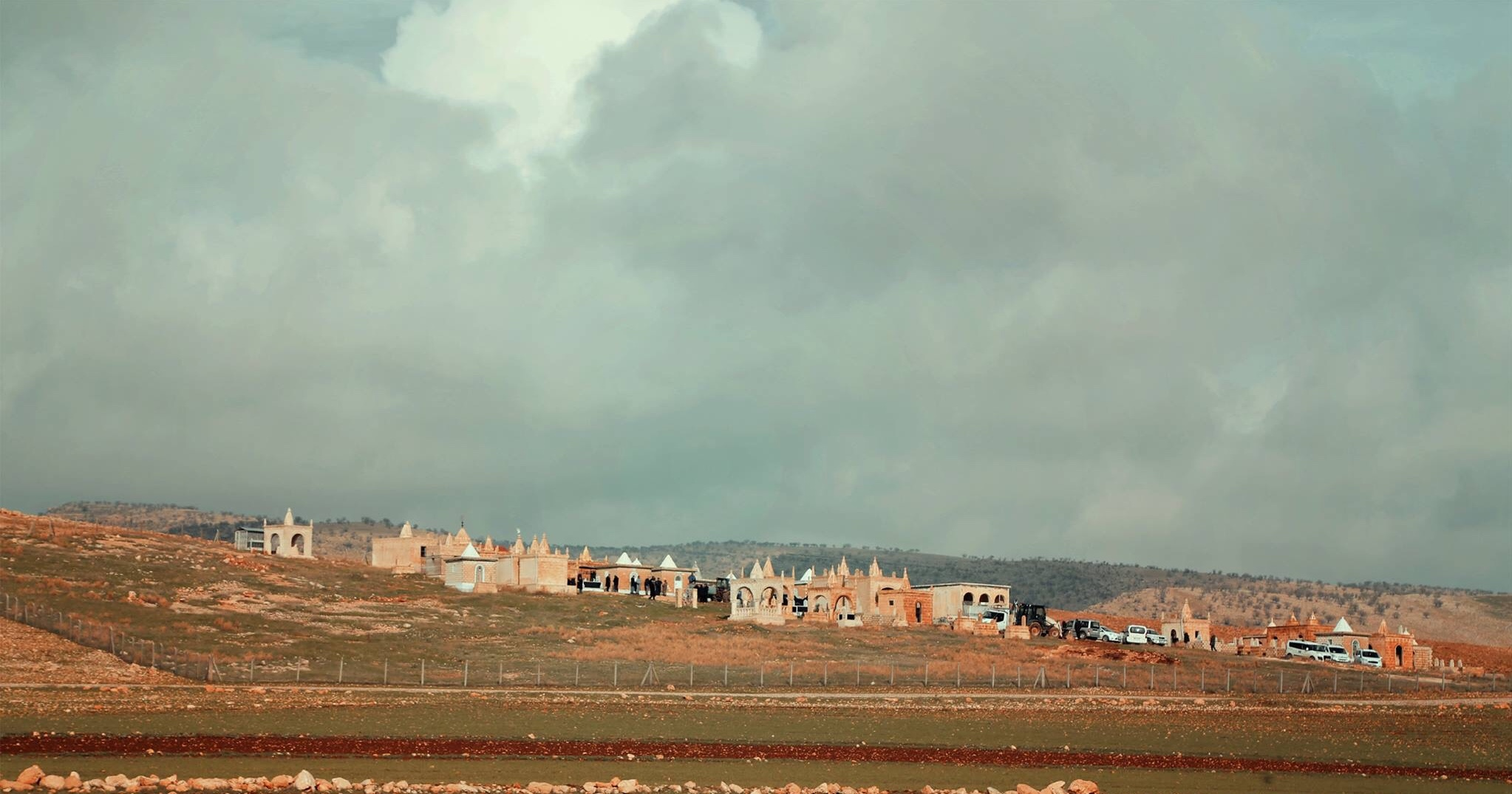
Another view of the Hesen Begê cemetery

The Yazidi cemetery of Hesen Begê (Kurdish: Goristana Hesen Begê) is a more than 300 years old Yazidi cemetery in southeastern Turkey.

== History ==
In March 2020, tombstones in the cemetery were destroyed by strangers.

== Location ==
The cemetery is about 1.5 km north of Çilesiz (Mezrê) and about 1 km west of Mağaracık (Xanik), and about 2.5 km southeast of Güneli (Geliyê Sora).
