= Hesen (name) =

Hesen is a surname and Chinese given name. Notable people with the name include:

== Given name ==
- Cai Hesen (蔡和森; 1895–1931), Chinese politician
- Ötkür Hesen (吾提库尔·艾山; born 1993), Chinese footballer

== Surname ==
- Ben Hesen (born 1986), American swimmer

== See also ==
- Hesen Begê Cemetery, a cemetery in Mardin Province, Turkey
