= Martuni =

Martuni may refer to:

== Places ==
- Martuni, Armenia, a town on the southern shores of Lake Sevan, Gegharkunik Province, Armenia
- Martuni (village), a village on the northern side of Lake Sevan, Gegharkunik Province, Armenia
- Martuni Province, a province of the former Republic of Artsakh (1991–2023)
  - Martuni, Nagorno-Karabakh, or Khojavend, the provincial capital of the Martuni Province
- Martuni District (NKAO), a district of the former Nagorno-Karabakh Autonomous Oblast of the Soviet Union
- Günəşli, Shamkir or Martuni, Azerbaijan

== People ==
- Alexander Miasnikian or Martuni (1886-1925), Armenian Bolshevik revolutionary and official
