= Dalğalı =

Dalğalı may refer to:

- Dalğalı, Khachmaz, Azerbaijan
- Dalğalı, Neftchala, Azerbaijan
