= Ekinciler, Mazıdağı =

Village in Mardin Province, Turkey

Ekinciler
- Neighbourhood
- Location in Turkey
- Coordinates: 37.481°N 40.386°E
- Country: Turkey
- Province: Mardin
- District: Mazıdağı
- Population (2021): 449
- Time zone: UTC+3 (TRT)

Ekinciler (Kurdish: Kufrag) is a neighbourhood in the municipality and district of Mazıdağı, Mardin Province in Turkey. The village is populated by Kurds of the Dimilî tribe and had a population of 449 in 2021.
