= Gürgöze, Mazıdağı =

Village in Mardin Province, Turkey

Gürgöze
- Neighbourhood
- Location in Turkey
- Coordinates: 37.486°N 40.526°E
- Country: Turkey
- Province: Mardin
- District: Mazıdağı
- Population (2021): 439
- Time zone: UTC+3 (TRT)

Gürgöze (Kurdish: Eynsilêman) is a neighbourhood in the municipality and district of Mazıdağı, Mardin Province in Turkey. The village is populated by Kurds of the Dimilî tribe and had a population of 439 in 2021.
