= Yağmur, Mazıdağı =

Village in Mardin Province, Turkey

Yağmur
- Neighbourhood
- Location in Turkey
- Coordinates: 37.414°N 40.504°E
- Country: Turkey
- Province: Mardin
- District: Mazıdağı
- Population (2021): 749
- Time zone: UTC+3 (TRT)

Yağmur (Kurdish: Awrixan) is a neighbourhood in the municipality and district of Mazıdağı, Mardin Province in Turkey. The village is populated by Kurds of the Hesinan tribe and had a population of 749 in 2021.
