= Arısu, Mazıdağı =

Village in Mardin Province, Turkey

Arısu
- Neighbourhood
- Location in Turkey
- Coordinates: 37.502°N 40.305°E
- Country: Turkey
- Province: Mardin
- District: Mazıdağı
- Population (2021): 110
- Time zone: UTC+3 (TRT)

Arısu (Kurdish: Gola Gule) is a neighbourhood in the municipality and district of Mazıdağı, Mardin Province in Turkey. The village is populated by Kurds of the Metînan tribe and had a population of 110 in 2021.
