= Yukarıocak, Mazıdağı =

Village in Mardin Province, Turkey

Yukarıocak
- Neighbourhood
- Location in Turkey
- Coordinates: 37.533°N 40.617°E
- Country: Turkey
- Province: Mardin
- District: Mazıdağı
- Population (2021): 281
- Time zone: UTC+3 (TRT)

Yukarıocak (Kurdish: Kura Helal) is a neighbourhood in the municipality and district of Mazıdağı, Mardin Province in Turkey. The village is populated by Kurds of the Surgucu tribe and had a population of 281 in 2021.
