= Işıkyaka, Mazıdağı =

Village in Mardin Province, Turkey

Işıkyaka
- Neighbourhood
- Location within Turkey
- Coordinates: 37.499°N 40.573°E
- Country: Turkey
- Province: Mardin
- District: Mazıdağı
- Population (2021): 131
- Time zone: UTC+3 (TRT)

Işıkyaka (Kurdish: Bikrê) is a neighbourhood in the municipality and district of Mazıdağı, Mardin Province in Turkey. The village is populated by Kurds of the Barava tribe and has a population of 131 in 2021.
