= Şanlı, Mazıdağı =

Village in Mardin Province, Turkey

Şanlı
- Neighbourhood
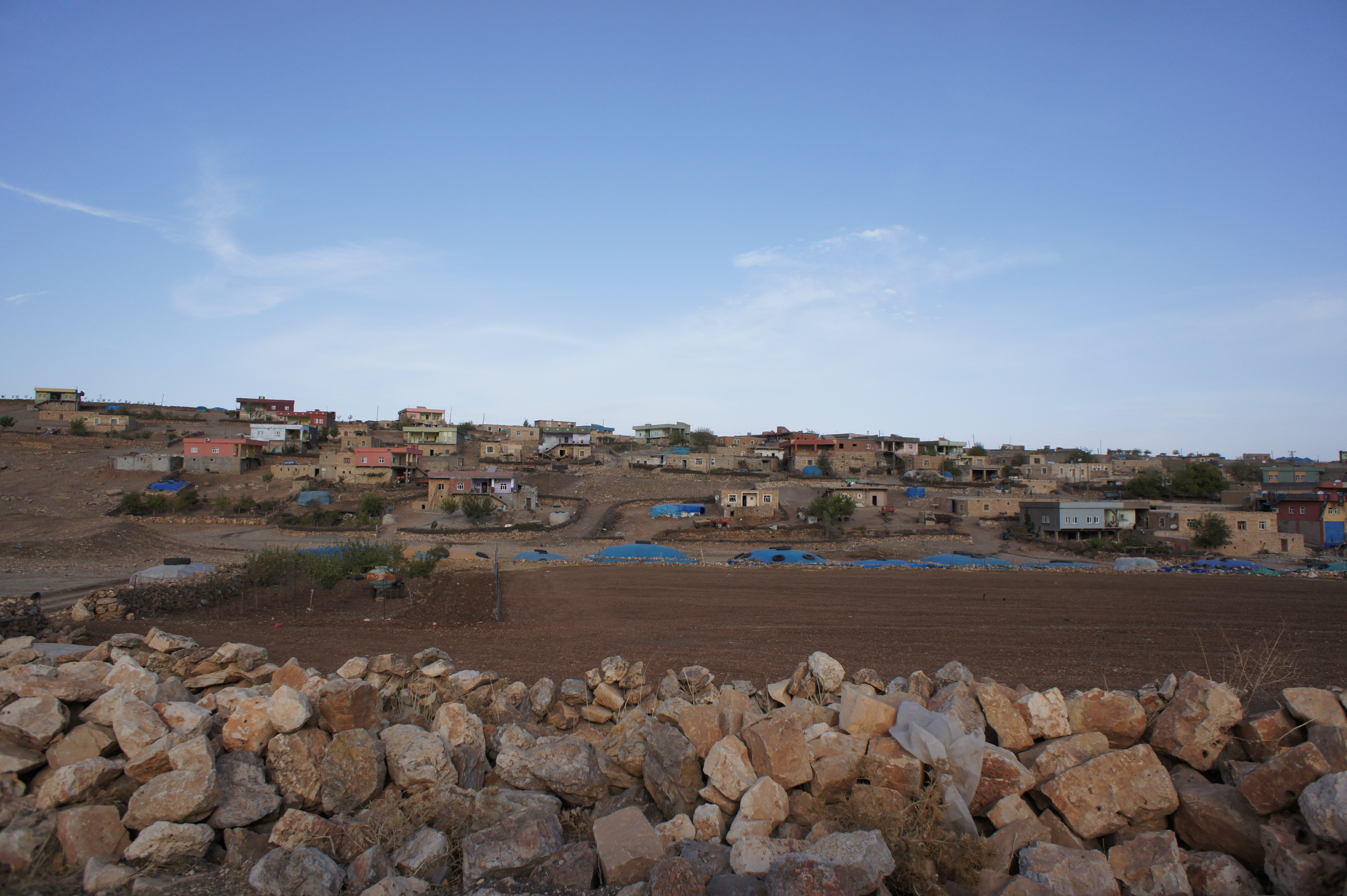

- Location within Turkey
- Coordinates: 37.456°N 40.381°E
- Country: Turkey
- Province: Mardin
- District: Mazıdağı
- Population (2021): 1,570
- Time zone: UTC+3 (TRT)

Şanlı (Kurdish: Dêşan) is a neighbourhood in the municipality and district of Mazıdağı, Mardin Province in Turkey. The village is populated by Kurds of the Çayî tribe and had a population of 1,570 in 2021.
