= Nabran =

- Municipality
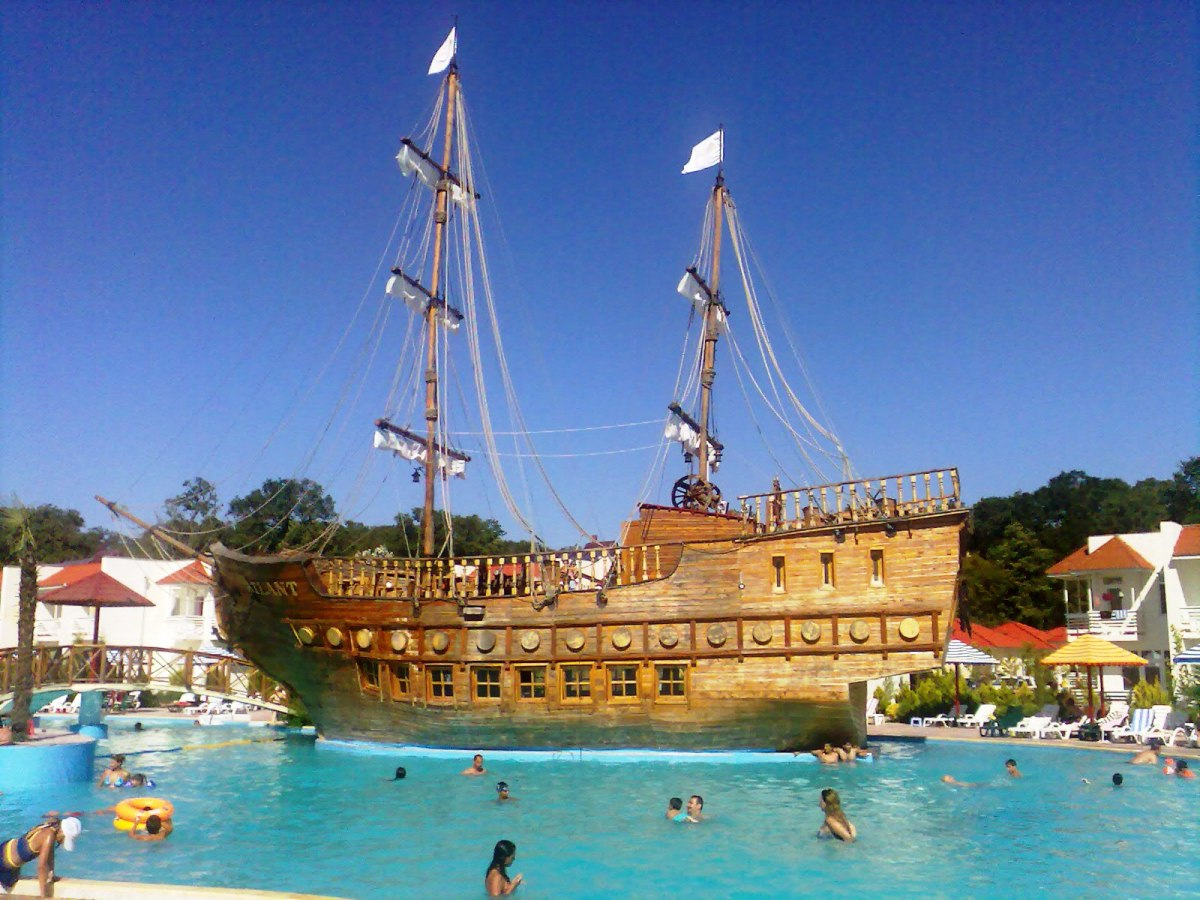
- Atlant leisure facility in Nabran

- Location within Azerbaijan
- Coordinates: 41°45′44″N 48°41′52″E
- Country: Azerbaijan
- District: Khachmaz

Population
  - Total: 1,313
- Time zone: UTC+4 (AZT)

Nabran is a municipality located in the Khachmaz region which is located in Khachmaz Rayon of Azerbaijan, close to the Russia-Azerbaijan border. It has a population of 1,313. The municipality consists of the following villages Nabran, Dalğalı, Turist, Meşəli, Günəşli, Samurçay, and Şimal. Nabran is the largest region within the Khachmaz Rayon. Nabran is a 3-hour drive from the capital of Azerbaijan, Baku, and is located on the Caspian seashore in a subtropical forestland. The settlement covers several kilometers.

== Tourism ==
The village is located in a northeast part of Azerbaijan on the bank of the Caspian Sea and is surrounded by forest. Nabran has a resort zone, and tourists are attracted by the climate, which remains moderate throughout the year: it is dry and warm in summer and wet in winter, but it is not especially frosty.

== Nature ==
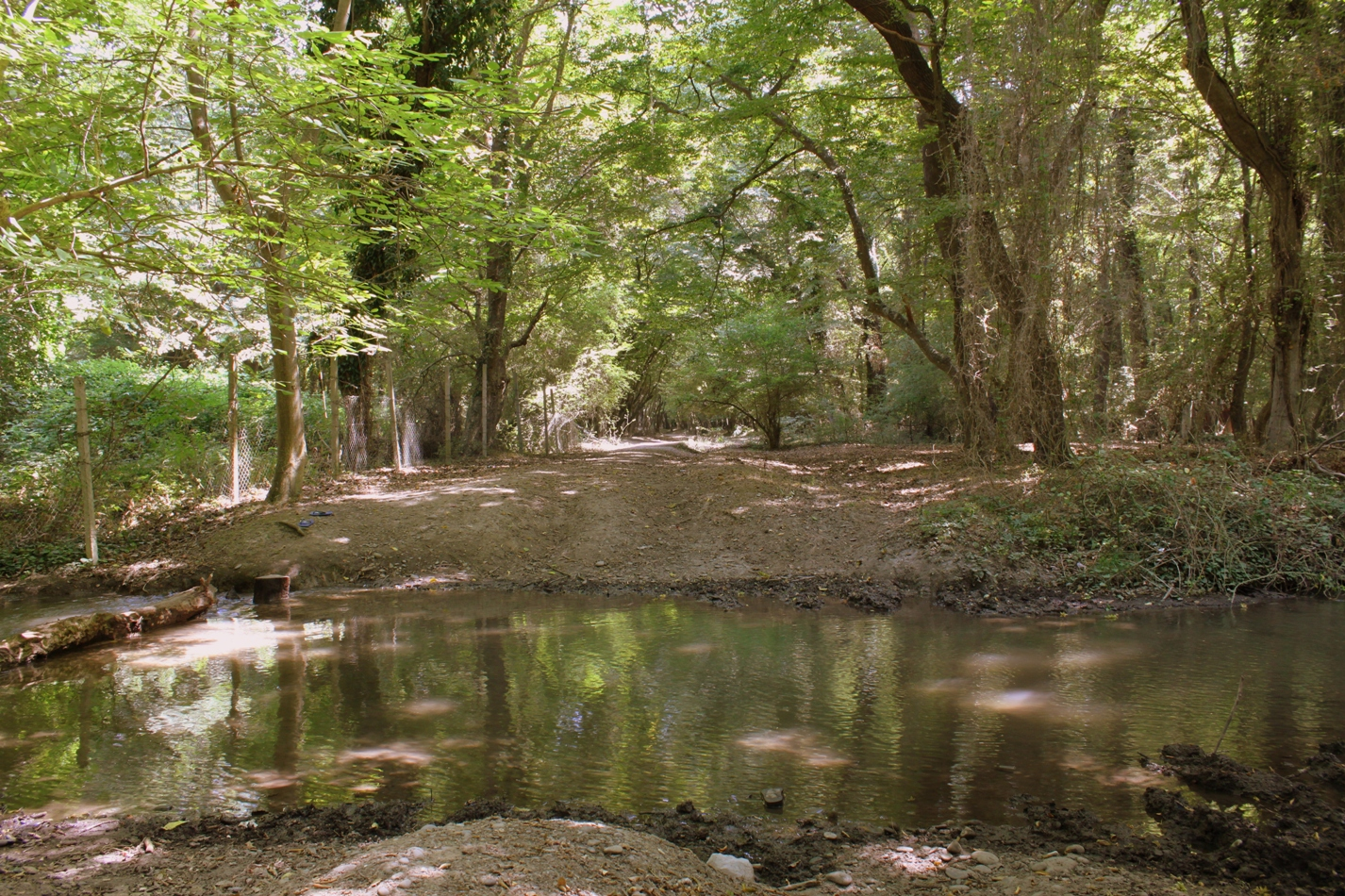
One of the forests in Nabran

The forested area which is immediately intertwined with the sandy beach is rich with unique trees particular to this area. In the background, the forests merge with Mount Shahdagh of Greater Caucasus Mountain range. Due to absence of manufacturing industry and low population density, the sea water is clean compared to heavily industrialized Absheron Peninsula. Nabran area is rich with clean drinking water flowing from Mount Shahdagh. In the early 1900s, at Haji Zeynalabdin Taghiyev's initiative, a project was started with an intention to pump the clean drinking water from the area to Baku. The pipe would start from Shollar village and travel south to Hacı Zeynalabdin village (formerly known as "Nasosnaya" meaning pumping station in Russian) in the vicinity of Baku where it would be pumped to the higher ground on which Baku is located. The project was completed in 1917.

== Recreational facilities ==
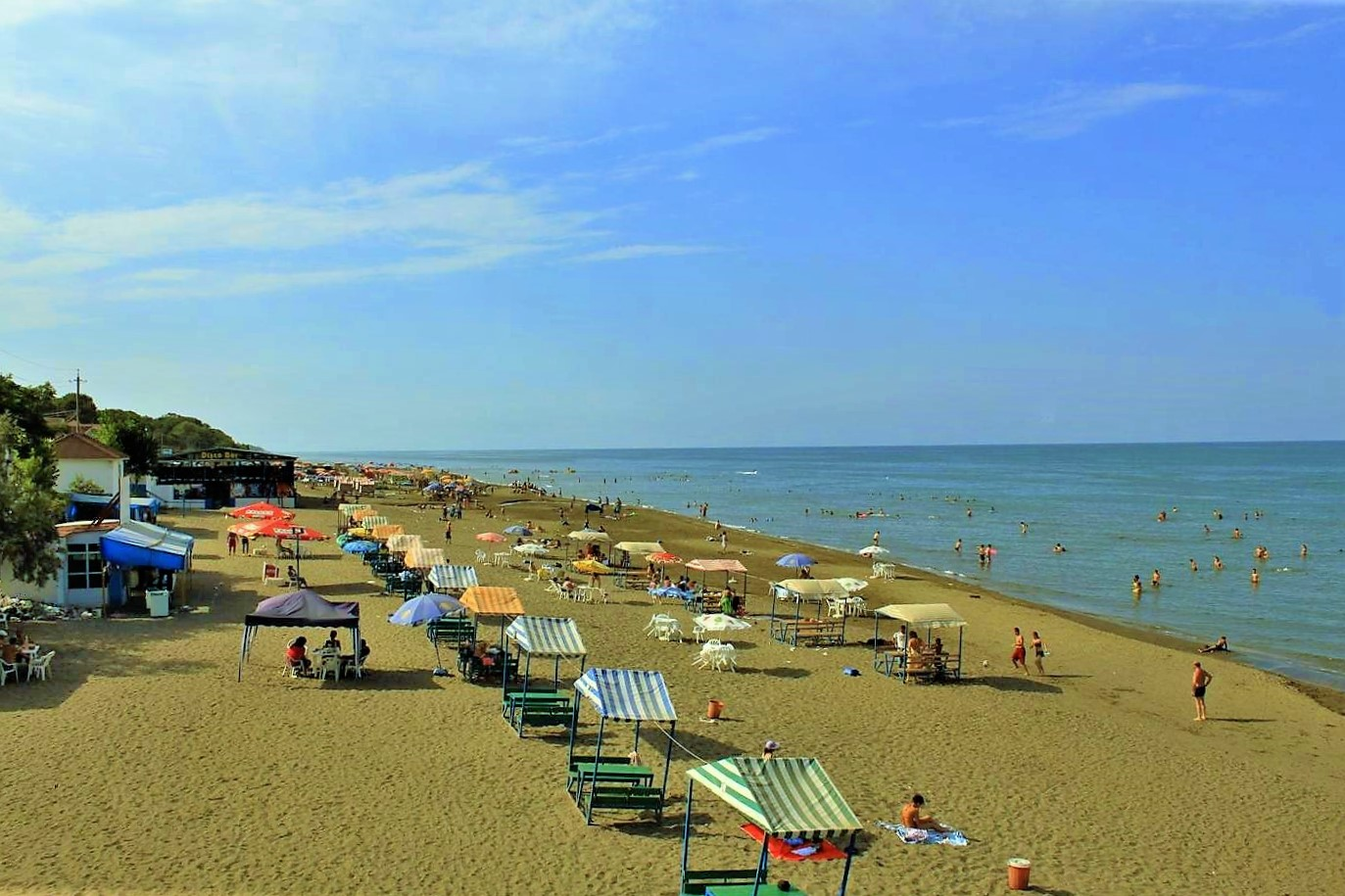
Nabran Beach

Nabran is rich with many recreation facilities offering a wide variety of services from upscale accommodations, athletic activities, children camps to music entertainment. Most of the accommodations are 2-story cottages or town houses. The variety of tourists includes domestic visitors, tourists from Russia and expats working in the capital Baku. Throughout the history of the area, Nabran served as the resort for oil workers of State Oil Company of Azerbaijan Republic. The company still has two tourist hostels. In 2009, Nabran tourism expansion project was started in order to create more facilities for increasing tourism in the area. A planned amount for the project is $110 million.

== Gallery ==
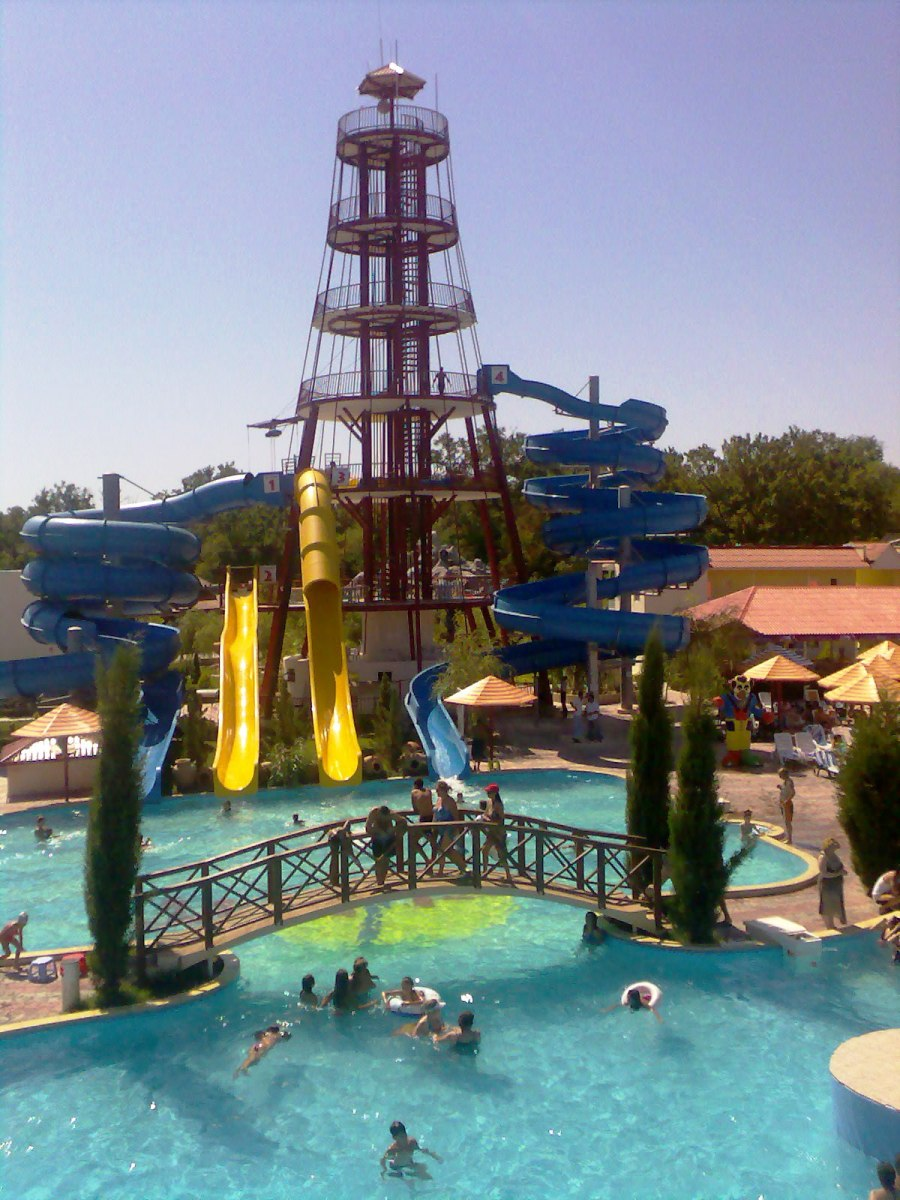
One of resorts in Nabran

Nabran sea coast

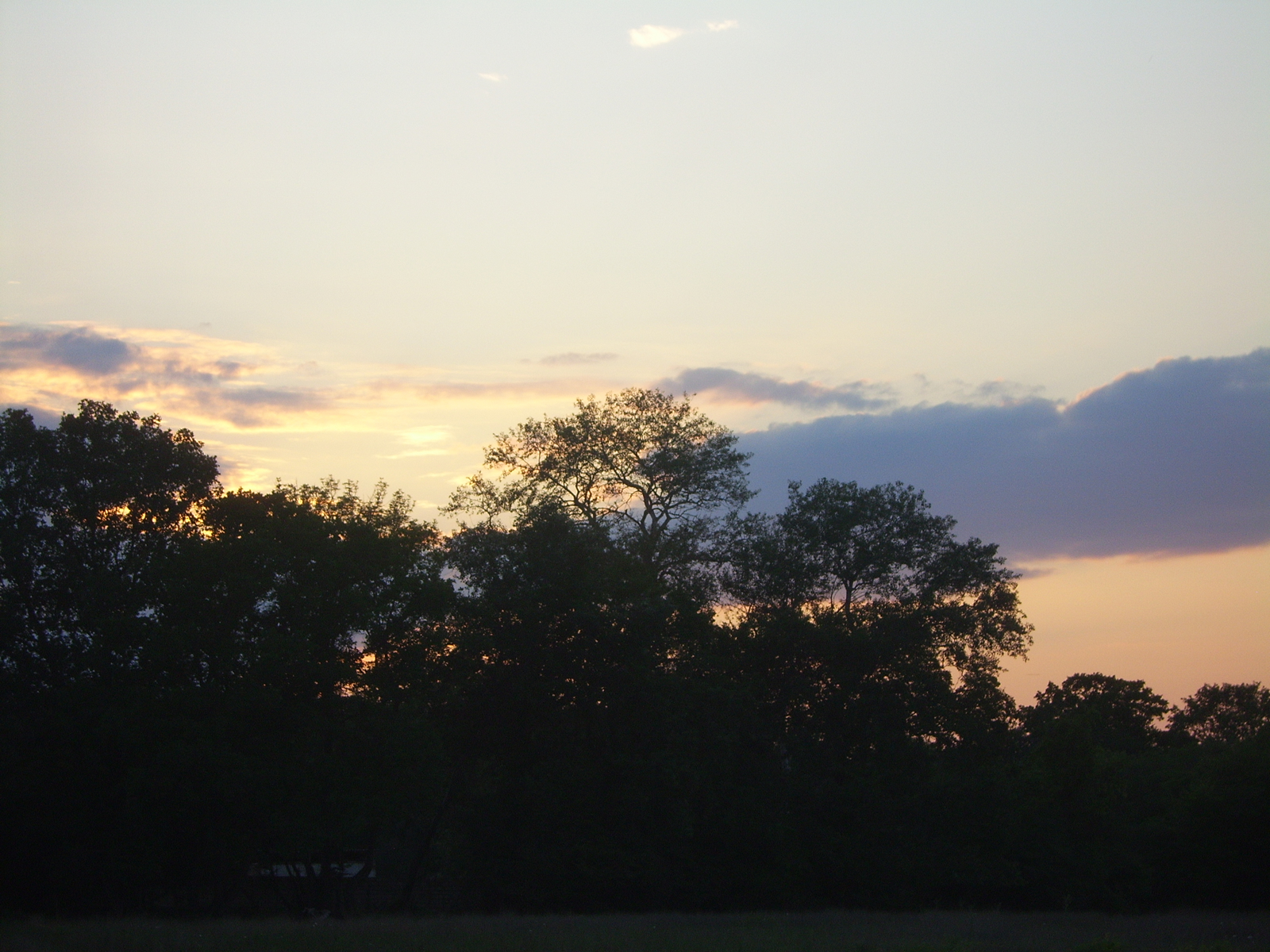
Nabran forest next to sandy beach

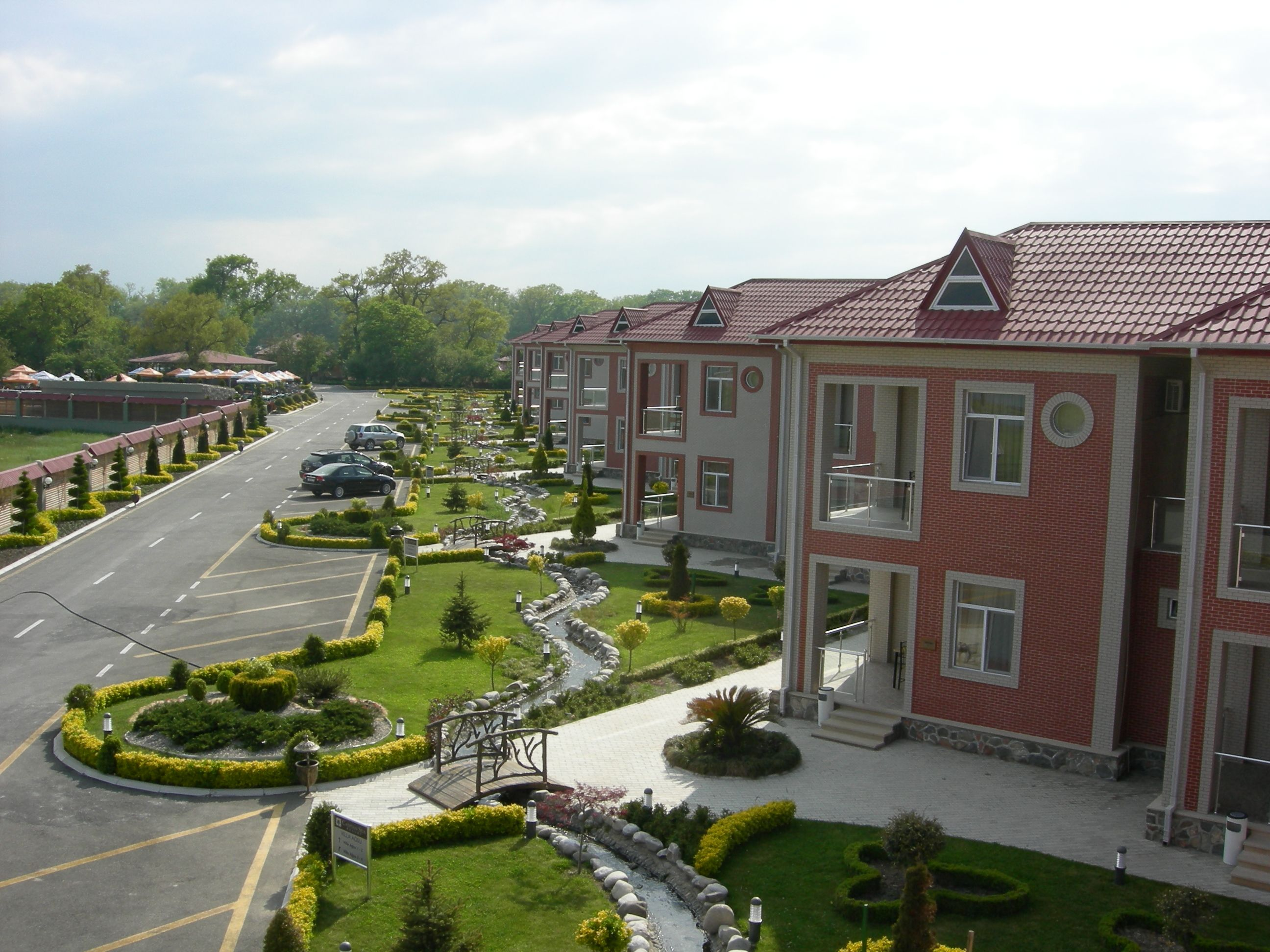
Nabran Caspian Sea Resort

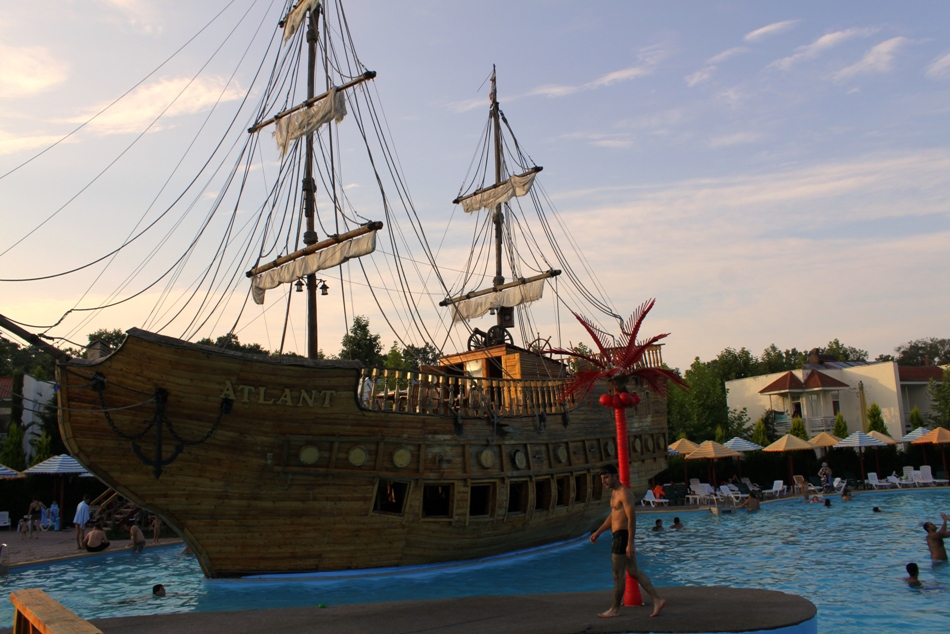
Atlant leisure facility

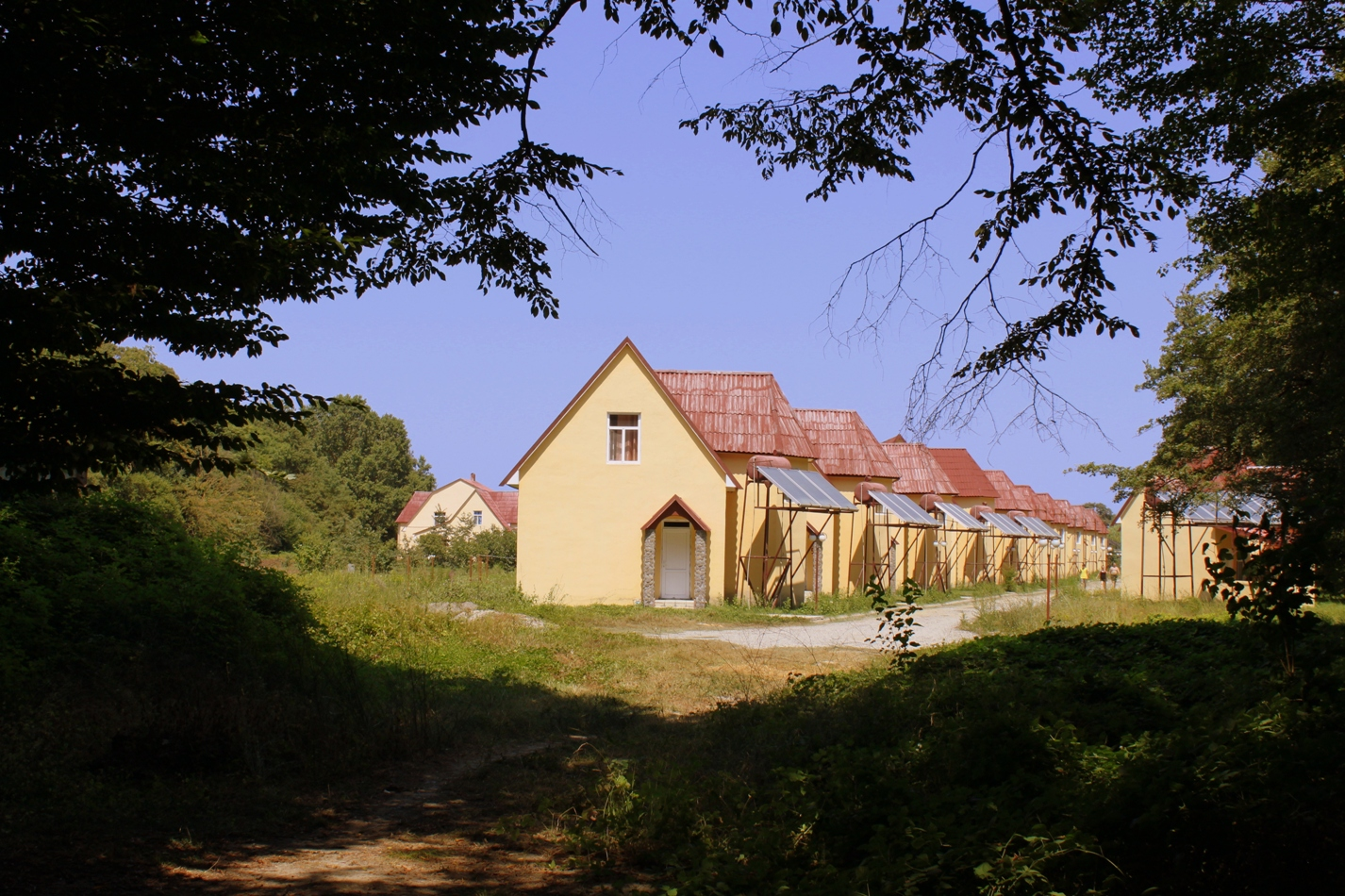
Nabran

Nabran

Nabran
