= Çayönü, Mazıdağı =

Village in Mardin Province, Turkey

Çayönü
- Neighbourhood
- Location in Turkey
- Coordinates: 37.385°N 40.396°E
- Country: Turkey
- Province: Mardin
- District: Mazıdağı
- Population (2021): 211
- Time zone: UTC+3 (TRT)

Çayönü (Kurdish: Lalan) is a neighbourhood in the municipality and district of Mazıdağı, Mardin Province in Turkey. The village is populated by Kurds of the Çayî tribe and had a population of 211 in 2021.
