= Çankaya, Mazıdağı =

Village in Mardin Province, Turkey

Çankaya
- Neighbourhood
- Location in Turkey
- Coordinates: 37.461°N 40.559°E
- Country: Turkey
- Province: Mardin
- District: Mazıdağı
- Population (2021): 61
- Time zone: UTC+3 (TRT)

Çankaya (Kurdish: Qêmêzê) is a neighbourhood in the municipality and district of Mazıdağı, Mardin Province in Turkey. The village is populated by Kurds of the Dimilî tribe and had a population of 61 in 2021.
