= Ürünlü, Mazıdağı =

Village in Mardin Province, Turkey

Ürünlü
- Neighbourhood
- Location in Turkey
- Coordinates: 37.376°N 40.448°E
- Country: Turkey
- Province: Mardin
- District: Mazıdağı
- Population (2021): 390
- Time zone: UTC+3 (TRT)

Ürünlü (Kurdish: Qolçiya) is a neighbourhood in the municipality and district of Mazıdağı, Mardin Province in Turkey. The village had a population of 390 in 2021.
