= Konur, Mazıdağı =

Village in Mardin Province, Turkey

Konur
- Neighbourhood
- Location in Turkey
- Coordinates: 37.321°N 40.392°E
- Country: Turkey
- Province: Mardin
- District: Mazıdağı
- Population (2021): 84
- Time zone: UTC+3 (TRT)

Konur (Kurdish: Şeba jor) is a neighbourhood in the municipality and district of Mazıdağı, Mardin Province in Turkey. The village is populated by Kurds of the Şêb tribe and had a population of 84 in 2021.
