= Karaalanı, Mazıdağı =

Village in Mardin Province, Turkey

Karaalanı
- Neighbourhood
- Location in Turkey
- Coordinates: 37.471°N 40.519°E
- Country: Turkey
- Province: Mardin
- District: Mazıdağı
- Population (2021): 1,648
- Time zone: UTC+3 (TRT)

Karaalanı (Kurdish: Mêqere) is a neighbourhood in the municipality and district of Mazıdağı, Mardin Province in Turkey. The village is populated by Kurds of the Dimilî tribe and had a population of 1,648 in 2021.
