= Duraklı, Mazıdağı =

Village in Mardin Province, Turkey

Duraklı
- Neighbourhood
- Location in Turkey
- Coordinates: 37.547°N 40.516°E
- Country: Turkey
- Province: Mardin
- District: Mazıdağı
- Population (2021): 370
- Time zone: UTC+3 (TRT)

Duraklı (Kurdish: Helêla) (Note: Also known as Halilan, Helela, or Khalila.) is a neighbourhood in the municipality and district of Mazıdağı, Mardin Province in Turkey. The village is populated by Kurds of the Dimilî tribe and had a population of 370 in 2021.

== History ==
Halilan (today called Duraklı) was historically inhabited by Armenians. It was located in the Derik kaza in the Diyarbakır sanjak in the Diyarbekir vilayet in c. 1900. In 1914, there were 200 Muslims and 60 Catholics without a priest at Halilan.

== Bibliography ==
- Courtois, Sébastien de (2004). The Forgotten Genocide: Eastern Christians, The Last Arameans. Translated by Vincent Aurora. Gorgias Press.
- Jongerden, Joost; Verheij, Jelle, eds. (2012). Social Relations in Ottoman Diyarbekir, 1870-1915. Brill.
