= Arıköy, Mazıdağı =

Village in Mardin Province, Turkey

Arıköy
- Neighbourhood
- Location in Turkey
- Coordinates: 37.444°N 40.519°E
- Country: Turkey
- Province: Mardin
- District: Mazıdağı
- Population (2021): 263
- Time zone: UTC+3 (TRT)

Arıköy (Kurdish: Xana Zembûr) is a neighbourhood in the municipality and district of Mazıdağı, Mardin Province in Turkey. The village had a population of 263 in 2021.
