= Ömürlü, Mazıdağı =

Village in Mardin Province, Turkey

Ömürlü
- Neighbourhood
- Location in Turkey
- Coordinates: 37.507°N 40.516°E
- Country: Turkey
- Province: Mardin
- District: Mazıdağı
- Population (2021): 509
- Time zone: UTC+3 (TRT)

Ömürlü (Kurdish: Pîran) (Note: Also known as Piran or Pirane.) is a neighbourhood in the municipality and district of Mazıdağı, Mardin Province in Turkey. The village is populated by Kurds of the Barava and Dimilî tribes; in 2021, it had a population of 509.

== History ==
Piran (today called Ömürlü) was historically inhabited by Armenians. It was located in the Derik kaza in the Diyarbakır sanjak in the Diyarbekir vilayet in c. 1900. In 1914, the village's population was 600, including 80 Armenian Catholics without a priest, whilst the rest was Muslim.

== Bibliography ==
- Courtois, Sébastien de (2004). The Forgotten Genocide: Eastern Christians, The Last Arameans. Translated by Vincent Aurora. Gorgias Press.
- Jongerden, Joost; Verheij, Jelle, eds. (2012). Social Relations in Ottoman Diyarbekir, 1870-1915. Brill.
