= Çiçekli =

Çiçekli (literally "with flowers" or "place with flowers") is a Turkish place name and may refer to:

- Çiçekli, Ceyhan, a village in Ceyhan district of Adana Province, Turkey
- Çiçekli, Gercüş, a village in Gercüş district of Batman Province, Turkey
- Çiçekli, İvrindi, a village
- Çiçekli, İznik
- Çiçekli, Pasinler
- Çiçekli, Sungurlu
- Çiçekli, Tarsus, a village in Tarsus district of Mersin Province, Turkey
- Çiçekli, Yüreğir, a village in Yüreğir district of Adana Province, Turkey

== See also ==
- Çiçeklidağ, Hanak, ("flower mountain"), a village in Hanak district of Ardahan Province, Turkey
- Çiçəkli (disambiguation)
