= Derecik, Mazıdağı =

Village in Mardin Province, Turkey

Derecik
- Neighbourhood
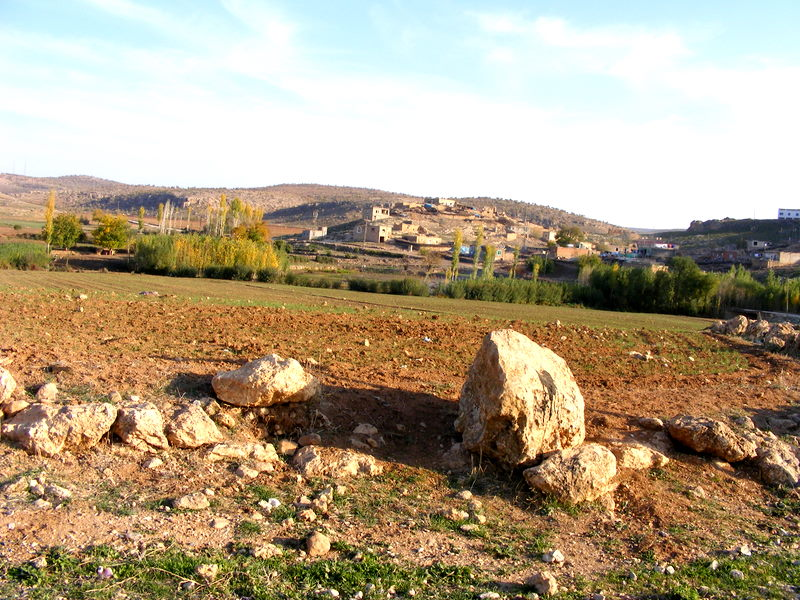

- Location within Turkey
- Coordinates: 37.520°N 40.524°E
- Country: Turkey
- Province: Mardin
- District: Mazıdağı
- Population (2021): 130
- Time zone: UTC+3 (TRT)

Derecik (Kurdish: Tawisî) is a neighbourhood in the municipality and district of Mazıdağı, Mardin Province in Turkey. The village is populated by Kurds of the Dimilî tribe and had a population of 130 in 2021.
