= Dəyəqarabulaq =

- Municipality
- Location within Azerbaijan
- Coordinates: 40°30′40″N 45°48′26″E
- Country: Azerbaijan
- Rayon: Gadabay

Population
  - Total: 2,016
- Time zone: UTC+4 (AZT)
  - Summer (DST): UTC+5 (AZT)

Dəyəqarabulaq (also, Dəyərqarabulaq, Dayakarabulag, and Dayakarabulak) is a village and municipality in the Gadabay Rayon of Azerbaijan. It has a population of 2,016. The municipality consists of the villages of Dəyəqarabulaq, Musayal, and Günəşli (formerly, Şurakənd).
