= Evciler, Mazıdağı =

Village in Mardin Province, Turkey

Evciler
- Neighbourhood
- Location in Turkey
- Coordinates: 37.392°N 40.434°E
- Country: Turkey
- Province: Mardin
- District: Mazıdağı
- Population (2021): 1,654
- Time zone: UTC+3 (TRT)

Evciler (Kurdish: Qesrik) is a neighbourhood in the municipality and district of Mazıdağı, Mardin Province in Turkey. The village is populated by Kurds of the Çayî tribe and had a population of 1,654 in 2021.
