= Kışlak, Mazıdağı =

Village in Mardin Province, Turkey

Kışlak
- Neighbourhood
- Location in Turkey
- Coordinates: 37.498°N 40.647°E
- Country: Turkey
- Province: Mardin
- District: Mazıdağı
- Population (2021): 92
- Time zone: UTC+3 (TRT)

Kışlak (Kurdish: Şivistan) is a neighbourhood in the municipality and district of Mazıdağı, Mardin Province in Turkey. The village is populated by Kurds of the Surgucu tribe and had a population of 92 in 2021.
