= Gümüşpınar, Mazıdağı =

Village in Mardin Province, Turkey

Gümüşpınar
- Neighbourhood
- Location in Turkey
- Coordinates: 37.433°N 40.382°E
- Country: Turkey
- Province: Mardin
- District: Mazıdağı
- Population (2021): 705
- Time zone: UTC+3 (TRT)

Gümüşpınar (Kurdish: Tarîn) is a neighbourhood in the municipality and district of Mazıdağı, Mardin Province in Turkey. The village is populated by Kurds of the Çayî tribe and had a population of 705 in 2021.
