= Tarlacık, Mazıdağı =

Village in Mardin Province, Turkey

Tarlacık
- Neighbourhood
- Location in Turkey
- Coordinates: 37.536°N 40.579°E
- Country: Turkey
- Province: Mardin
- District: Mazıdağı
- Population (2021): 272
- Time zone: UTC+3 (TRT)

Tarlacık (Kurdish: Hetvan) is a neighbourhood in the municipality and district of Mazıdağı, Mardin Province in Turkey. The village is populated by Kurds of the Barava and Surgucu tribes and had a population of 272 in 2021.
