= Ulutaş, Mazıdağı =

Village in Mardin Province, Turkey

Ulutaş
- Neighbourhood
- Location in Turkey
- Coordinates: 37.396°N 40.524°E
- Country: Turkey
- Province: Mardin
- District: Mazıdağı
- Population (2021): 574
- Time zone: UTC+3 (TRT)

Ulutaş (Kurdish: Hesena) is a neighbourhood in the municipality and district of Mazıdağı, Mardin Province in Turkey. The village is populated by Kurds of the Hesinan tribe and had a population of 574 in 2021.
