= Karataş, Mazıdağı =

Village in Mardin Province, Turkey

Karataş
- Neighbourhood
- Location in Turkey
- Coordinates: 37.498°N 40.329°E
- Country: Turkey
- Province: Mardin
- District: Mazıdağı
- Population (2021): 231
- Time zone: UTC+3 (TRT)

Karataş (Kurdish: Şemika) is a neighbourhood in the municipality and district of Mazıdağı, Mardin Province in Turkey. The village is populated by Kurds of the Metînan tribe and had a population of 231 in 2021.
