= Daşlıyataq =

- Location within Azerbaijan
- Coordinates: 41°18′N 48°44′E
- Country: Azerbaijan
- Rayon: Davachi
- Municipality: Günəşli
- Time zone: UTC+4 (AZT)
  - Summer (DST): UTC+5 (AZT)

Daşlıyataq (also, Dashlyyatag) is a village in the Davachi Rayon of Azerbaijan. The village forms part of the municipality of Günəşli.
