= Aksu, Mazıdağı =

Village in Mardin Province, Turkey

Aksu
- Neighbourhood
- Location in Turkey
- Coordinates: 37.542°N 40.552°E
- Country: Turkey
- Province: Mardin
- District: Mazıdağı
- Population (2021): 209
- Time zone: UTC+3 (TRT)

Aksu (Kurdish: Avgewr) is a neighbourhood in the municipality and district of Mazıdağı, Mardin Province in Turkey. The village had a population of 209 in 2021.
