= Ortaklı, Mazıdağı =

Village in Mardin Province, Turkey

Ortaklı
- Neighbourhood
- Location in Turkey
- Coordinates: 37.552°N 40.480°E
- Country: Turkey
- Province: Mardin
- District: Mazıdağı
- Population (2021): 48
- Time zone: UTC+3 (TRT)

Ortaklı (Kurdish: Xirbê Helêla) is a neighbourhood in the municipality and district of Mazıdağı, Mardin Province in Turkey. The village is populated by Kurds of the Dimilî tribe and had a population of 48 in 2021.
