= Aşağıocak, Mazıdağı =

Village in Mardin Province, Turkey

Aşağıocak
- Neighbourhood
- Location in Turkey
- Coordinates: 37.545°N 40.609°E
- Country: Turkey
- Province: Mardin
- District: Mazıdağı
- Population (2021): 229
- Time zone: UTC+3 (TRT)

Aşağıocak (Kurdish: Kura Hamam) is a neighbourhood in the municipality and district of Mazıdağı, Mardin Province in Turkey. The village is populated by Kurds of the Surgucu tribe and had a population of 229 in 2021.
