= Atalar, Mazıdağı =

Village in Mardin Province, Turkey

Atalar
- Neighbourhood
- Location in Turkey
- Coordinates: 37.372°N 40.358°E
- Country: Turkey
- Province: Mardin
- District: Mazıdağı
- Population (2021): 260
- Time zone: UTC+3 (TRT)

Atalar (Kurdish: Xarok) is a neighbourhood in the municipality and district of Mazıdağı, Mardin Province in Turkey. The village is populated by Kurds of the Abasan and Rutan tribes and had a population of 260 in 2021.
