= Turist =

- Location within Azerbaijan
- Coordinates: 41°48′58″N 48°37′51″E
- Country: Azerbaijan
- Rayon: Khachmaz
- Municipality: Nabran
- Time zone: UTC+4 (AZT)
  - Summer (DST): UTC+5 (AZT)

Turist is a village in the Khachmaz Rayon of Azerbaijan. The village forms part of the municipality of Nabran.

== Home Page Nabran ==
Nabran Resort zone
