= Kemerli, Mazıdağı =

Village in Mardin Province, Turkey

Kemerli
- Neighbourhood
- Location in Turkey
- Coordinates: 37.554°N 40.574°E
- Country: Turkey
- Province: Mardin
- District: Mazıdağı
- Population (2021): 492
- Time zone: UTC+3 (TRT)

Kemerli (Kurdish: Xerebazin) is a neighbourhood in the municipality and district of Mazıdağı, Mardin Province in Turkey. The village is populated by Kurds of the Barava tribe and had a population of 492 in 2021.
