= Balpınar, Mazıdağı =

Village in Mardin Province, Turkey

Balpınar
- Neighbourhood
- Location in Turkey
- Coordinates: 37.508°N 40.286°E
- Country: Turkey
- Province: Mardin
- District: Mazıdağı
- Population (2021): 1,324
- Time zone: UTC+3 (TRT)

Balpınar (Kurdish: Giresor) is a neighbourhood in the municipality and district of Mazıdağı, Mardin Province in Turkey. It is populated by Kurds of the Metînan tribe and had a population of 1,324 in 2021.
