= Erdalı, Mazıdağı =

Village in Mardin Province, Turkey

Erdalı
- Neighbourhood
- Location in Turkey
- Coordinates: 37.492°N 40.596°E
- Country: Turkey
- Province: Mardin
- District: Mazıdağı
- Population (2021): 77
- Time zone: UTC+3 (TRT)

Erdalı (Kurdish: Xerabê kurê) is a neighbourhood in the municipality and district of Mazıdağı, Mardin Province in Turkey. The village is populated by Kurds of the Surgucu tribe had a population of 77 in 2021.
