= Yeşilköy, Mazıdağı =

Village in Mardin Province, Turkey

Yeşilköy
- Neighbourhood
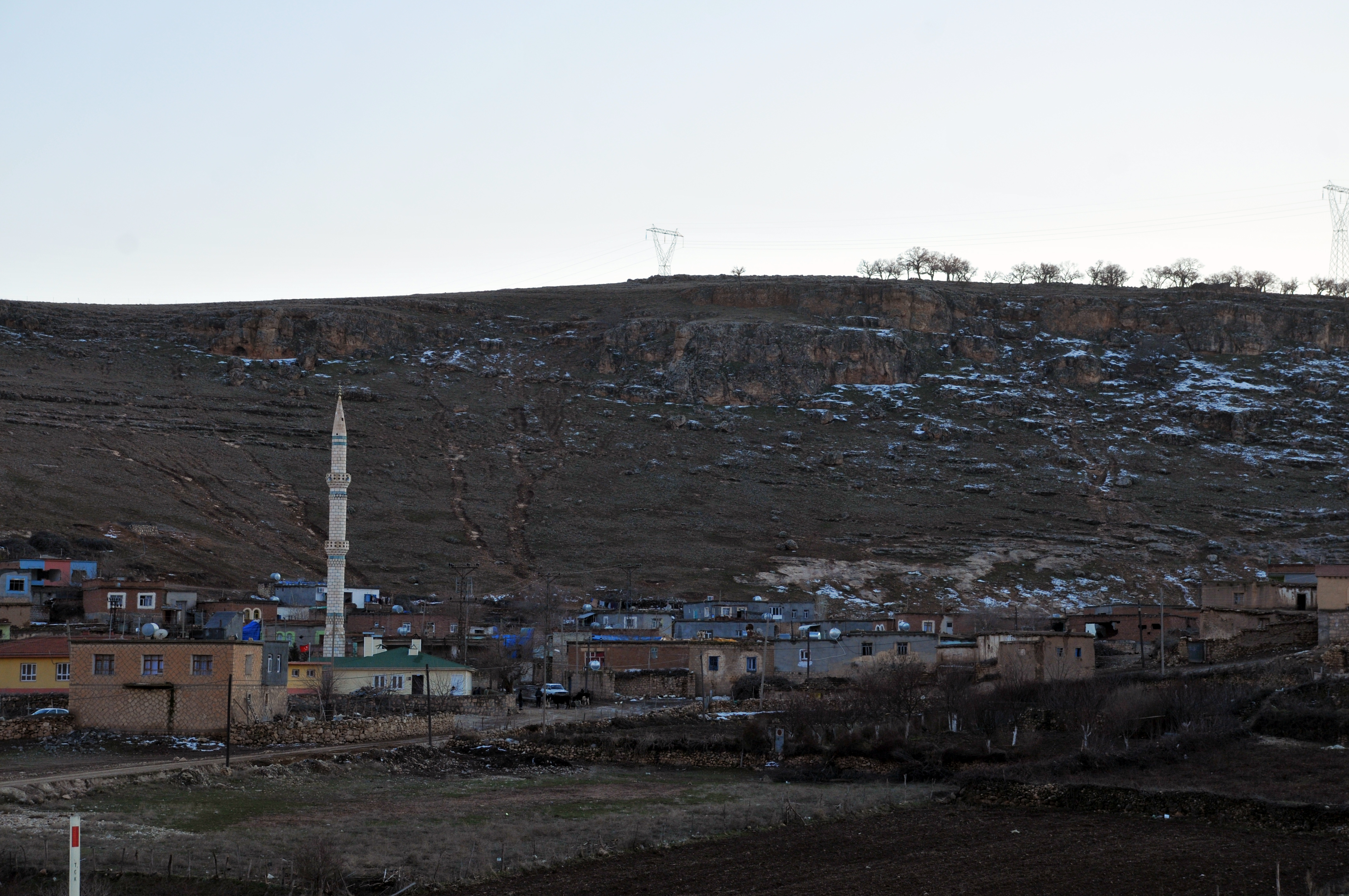

- Location within Turkey
- Coordinates: 37°34′56″N 40°30′00″E
- Country: Turkey
- Province: Mardin
- District: Mazıdağı
- Population (2021): 425
- Time zone: UTC+3 (TRT)

Yeşilköy (Kurdish: Xudurî) is a neighbourhood in the municipality and district of Mazıdağı, Mardin Province in Turkey. The village is populated by Kurds and had a population of 425 in 2021.

== History ==
The two clans in the village had been feuding for 75 years, from 1935 to 2010, until the BDP brokered peace between them. Osman Baydemir took part in the talks.
