= Yukarıkonak, Mazıdağı =

Village in Mardin Province, Turkey

Yukarıkonak
- Neighbourhood
- Location in Turkey
- Coordinates: 37.570°N 40.519°E
- Country: Turkey
- Province: Mardin
- District: Mazıdağı
- Population (2021): 426
- Time zone: UTC+3 (TRT)

Yukarıkonak (Kurdish: Xanika jor) is a neighbourhood in the municipality and district of Mazıdağı, Mardin Province in Turkey. The village is populated by Kurds of the Barava tribe and had a population of 426 in 2021.
