= Aykut, Mazıdağı =

Village in Mardin Province, Turkey

Aykut
- Neighbourhood
- Location in Turkey
- Coordinates: 37.514°N 40.641°E
- Country: Turkey
- Province: Mardin
- District: Mazıdağı
- Population (2021): 167
- Time zone: UTC+3 (TRT)

Aykut (Kurdish: Dêrgûz) is a neighbourhood in the municipality and district of Mazıdağı, Mardin Province in Turkey. The village is populated by Kurds of the Surgucu tribe had a population of 167 in 2021.
