= Atlıca, Mazıdağı =

Village in Mardin Province, Turkey

Atlıca
- Neighbourhood
- Location in Turkey
- Coordinates: 37.447°N 40.603°E
- Country: Turkey
- Province: Mardin
- District: Mazıdağı
- Population (2021): 465
- Time zone: UTC+3 (TRT)

Atlıca (Kurdish: Ziyareta Hesp, Şêxanê Jorin) is a neighbourhood in the municipality and district of Mazıdağı, Mardin Province in Turkey. The village had a population of 465 in 2021.
