= Sakızlı, Mazıdağı =

Village in Mardin Province, Turkey

Sakızlı
- Neighbourhood
- Location in Turkey
- Coordinates: 37.449°N 40.224°E
- Country: Turkey
- Province: Mardin
- District: Mazıdağı
- Population (2021): 1,590
- Time zone: UTC+3 (TRT)

Sakızlı (Kurdish: Banxir) is a neighbourhood in the municipality and district of Mazıdağı, Mardin Province in Turkey. The village is populated by Kurds of the Metînan tribe and had a population of 1,590 in 2021.
