= Gümüşyuva, Mazıdağı =

Village in Mardin Province, Turkey

Gümüşyuva
- Neighbourhood
- Location in Turkey
- Coordinates: 37.480°N 40.201°E
- Country: Turkey
- Province: Mardin
- District: Mazıdağı
- Population (2021): 349
- Time zone: UTC+3 (TRT)

Gümüşyuva (Kurdish: Dêra Metîna) is a neighbourhood in the municipality and district of Mazıdağı, Mardin Province in Turkey. The village is populated by Kurds of the Metînan tribe and had a population of 349 in 2021.
