= Sağmal, Mazıdağı =

Village in Mardin Province, Turkey

Sağmal
- Neighbourhood
- Location in Turkey
- Coordinates: 37.397°N 40.332°E
- Country: Turkey
- Province: Mardin
- District: Mazıdağı
- Population (2021): 769
- Time zone: UTC+3 (TRT)

Sağmal (Kurdish: Bîrînî) is a neighbourhood in the municipality and district of Mazıdağı, Mardin Province in Turkey. The village is populated by Kurds of Rutan tribe and had a population of 769 in 2021.
