= Günəşli, Davachi =

Village in the Shabran District of Azerbaijan

Günəşli
- Village and municipality
- Location in Azerbaijan
- Coordinates: 41.319°N 48.8159°E
- Country: Azerbaijan
- District: Shabran District

Population
  - Total: 693
- Time zone: UTC+4 (AZT)

Günəşli is a village and municipality in the Shabran Rayon of Azerbaijan. It has a population of 693. The municipality consists of the villages of Günəşli and Daşlıyataq.
