= Dalğalı, Khachmaz =

Human settlement in Azerbaijan

Dalğalı is a village within the municipality of Nabran, in the Khachmaz Rayon of Azerbaijan.
