= Çiçəkli, Sabirabad =

Village and municipality in Azerbaijan

Chichekli (Azerbaijani: Çiçəkli) is a village and municipality in the Sabirabad District of Azerbaijan. It has a population of 1,424.
