= Çiçəkli, Gədəbəy =

Chichekli
- Azerbaijani: Çiçəkli
- Location within Azerbaijan
- Coordinates: 40°33′N 45°34′E
- Country: Azerbaijan
- District: Gadabay
- Municipality: Shahdagh
- Time zone: UTC+4 (AZT)
  - Summer (DST): UTC+5 (AZT)

Çiçəkli (known as Arabachy until 2015) is a village in the Gadabay District of Azerbaijan. The village forms part of the municipality of Shahdagh (formerly, Shurakend).
