= Günəşli, Bilasuvar =

Günəşli
- Municipality
- Location within Azerbaijan
- Coordinates: 39°30′08″N 48°29′21″E
- Country: Azerbaijan
- Rayon: Bilasuvar

Population
  - Total: 2,723
- Time zone: UTC+4 (AZT)
  - Summer (DST): UTC+5 (AZT)

Günəşli (known as Kirovka until 2005) is a village and municipality in the Bilasuvar Rayon of Azerbaijan. It has a population of 2,723.
