= Çilesiz, Nusaybin =

Village in Mardin Province, Turkey

Çilesiz
- Neighbourhood
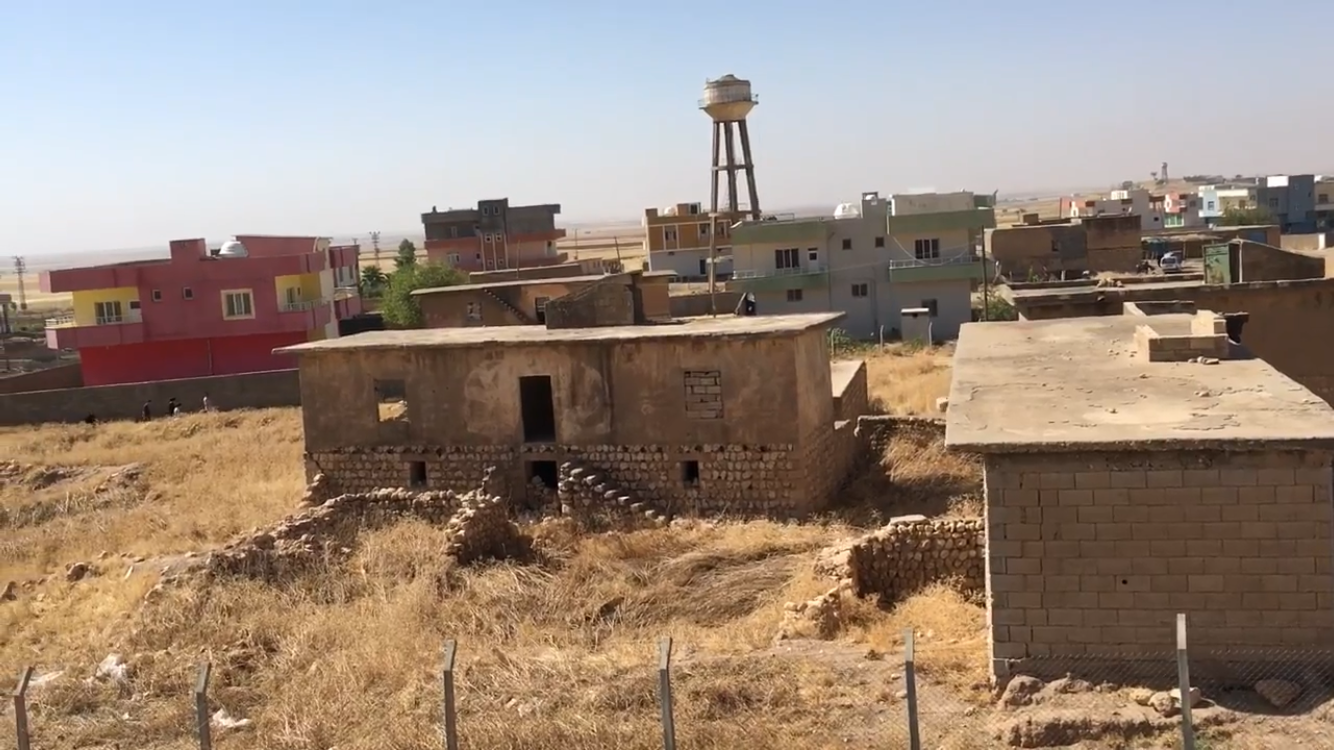

- Location within Turkey
- Coordinates: 37°8′35″N 41°32′34″E
- Country: Turkey
- Province: Mardin
- District: Nusaybin
- Population (2022): 34
- Time zone: UTC+3 (TRT)

Çilesiz (Kurdish: Mezra Mihoka; (Note: Also spelt as Mezri or Mezrimihoke.) Syriac: Mazrī) is a neighbourhood in the municipality and district of Nusaybin, Mardin Province, Turkey. The village is populated by Yazidi Kurds of the Dasikan tribe and had a population of 34 in 2022.

== History ==
Mazrī (today called Çilesiz) was historically inhabited by Syriac Orthodox Christians. In the Syriac Orthodox patriarchal register of dues of 1870, it was recorded that the village had six households, who paid sixteen dues, and it did not have a church or a priest. It is tentatively identified with the village of Mrzé, which was populated by 300 Syriacs in 1914, according to the list presented to the Paris Peace Conference by the Assyro-Chaldean delegation.

== Demography ==
Population history of the village from 1970 to 2022:

Population
Year	Pop.	±%
1970	404	—
1980	586	+45.0%
1990	130	−77.8%
2000	45	−65.4%
2007	29	−35.6%
2012	41	+41.4%
2022	34	−17.1%

== Bibliography ==
- Bcheiry, Iskandar (2009). The Syriac Orthodox Patriarchal Register of Dues of 1870: An Unpublished Historical Document from the Late Ottoman Period. Gorgias Press.
- Gaunt, David (2006). Massacres, Resistance, Protectors: Muslim-Christian Relations in Eastern Anatolia during World War I. Gorgias Press.
- Jongerden, Joost; Verheij, Jelle, eds. (2012). Social Relations in Ottoman Diyarbekir, 1870-1915. Brill.
- Sediyani, İbrahim (2009). Adını arayan coğrafya. Özedönüş Yayınları. ISBN 9786054296002.
- Tan, Altan (2018). Turabidin'den Berriye'ye. Aşiretler - Dinler - Diller - Kültürler (in Turkish). Pak Ajans Yayincilik Turizm Ve Diş Ticaret Limited şirketi. ISBN 9789944360944.
