= Güneyli, Jalilabad =

Güneyli
- Municipality
- Location within Azerbaijan
- Coordinates: 39°08′N 48°27′E
- Country: Azerbaijan
- Rayon: Jalilabad
- Time zone: UTC+4 (AZT)
  - Summer (DST): UTC+5 (AZT)

Güneyli (known as Badamağac until 2015) is a village and municipality in the Jalilabad Rayon of Azerbaijan.
