= Meşeli, Mazıdağı =

Village in Mardin Province, Turkey

Meşeli
- Neighbourhood
- Location in Turkey
- Coordinates: 37.365°N 40.405°E
- Country: Turkey
- Province: Mardin
- District: Mazıdağı
- Population (2021): 209
- Time zone: UTC+3 (TRT)

Meşeli (Kurdish: Melebiyê) is a neighbourhood in the municipality and district of Mazıdağı, Mardin Province in Turkey. The village is populated by Kurds of the Çayî tribe and had a population of 209 in 2021.

== Geography ==
It is located 65 km from the provincial capital Mardin and 15 km from the district center of Mazıdağı.
