= Meşəli, Khachmaz =

Meşəli
- Location within Azerbaijan
- Coordinates: 41°44′07″N 48°43′03″E
- Country: Azerbaijan
- Rayon: Khachmaz
- Municipality: Nabran

Population (2008)
  - Total: 106
- Time zone: UTC+4 (AZT)
  - Summer (DST): UTC+5 (AZT)

Meşəli is a village in the Khachmaz Rayon of Azerbaijan. The village forms part of the municipality of Nabran.
