= Günəşli, Khachmaz =

Village in the Khachmaz District of Azerbaijan

Günəşli
- Village
- Location in Azerbaijan
- Country: Azerbaijan
- District: Khachmaz District
- Municipality: Nabran
- Time zone: UTC+4 (AZT)

Günəşli is a village in the municipality of Nabran in the Khachmaz Rayon of Azerbaijan.
