= Mazıdağı =

- District and municipality
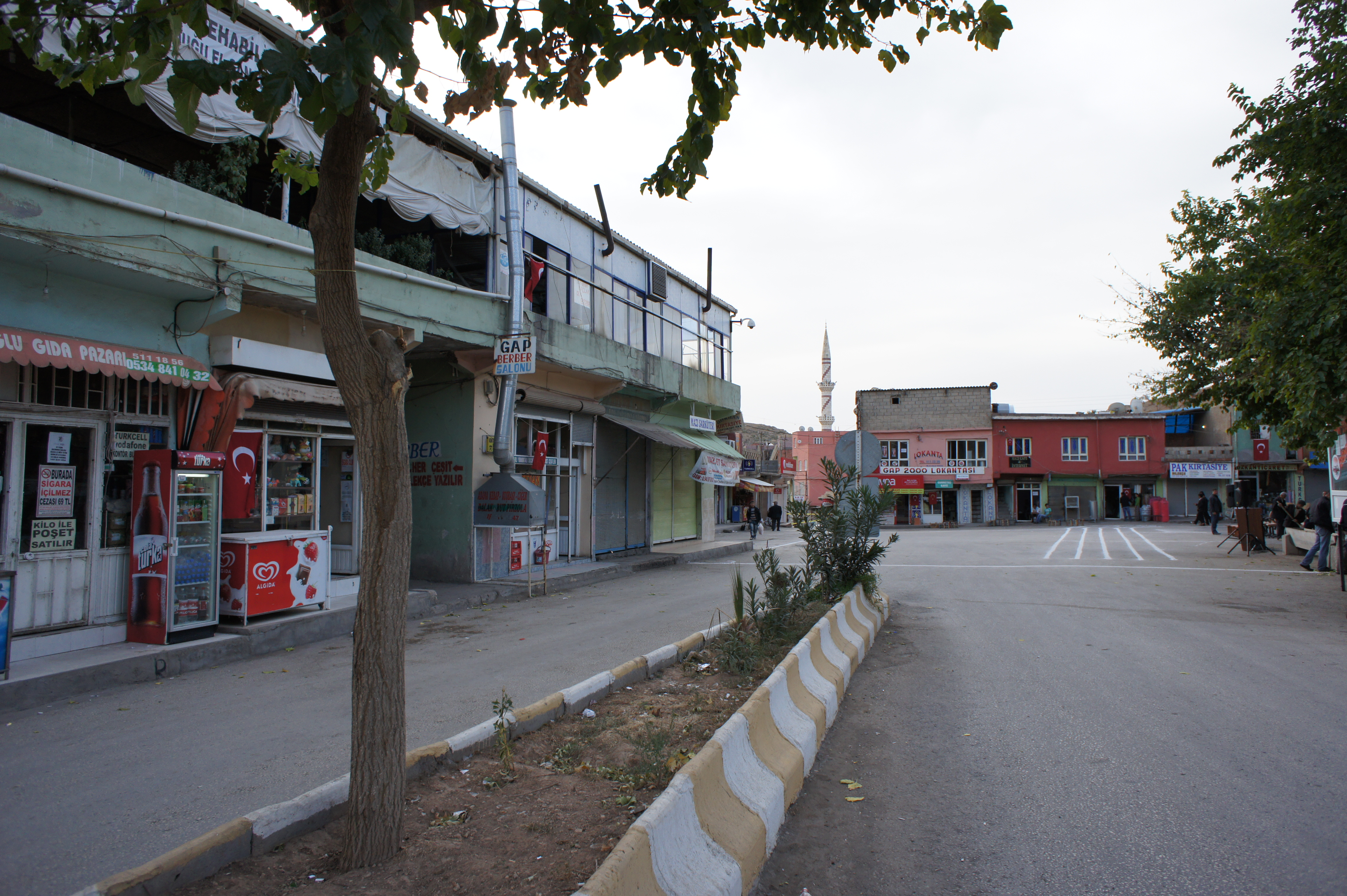
- A street in Mazıdağı

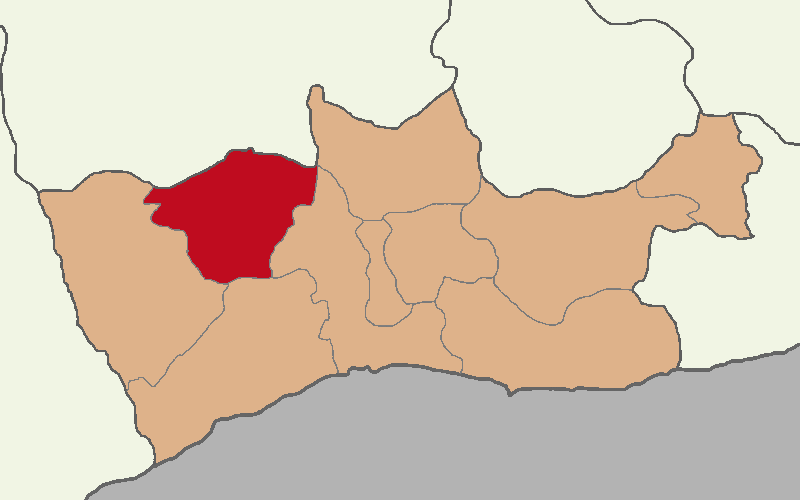
- Map showing Mazıdağı District in Mardin Province

- Location within Turkey
- Coordinates: 37°28′45″N 40°29′11″E
- Country: Turkey
- Province: Mardin
- Area: 850 km^{2} (330 sq mi)
- Population (2022): 36,442
  - Density: 43/km^{2} (110/sq mi)
- Time zone: UTC+3 (TRT)
- Area code: 0482
- Website: www.mazidagibelediyesi.gov.tr

Mazıdağı (Kurdish: Şemrex) is a municipality and district of Mardin Province, Turkey. Its area is 850 km^{2}, and its population is 36,442 (2022). The town is populated by Kurds of the Dimilî tribe.

== Politics ==
In the local elections of 2009 Hasip Aktas was elected as mayor as a member of the Democratic Society Party (DTP) with 57% of all votes. In the local elections of 2014, Necia Yıldırım from the DTP became Mayor. In the municipal elections of 2019, Nalan Özaydın from the Peoples' Democratic Party was elected as Mayor of Mazıdağı. On the 15 November 2019 she was detained over alleged terror links. The next day she was dismissed.

== Resources ==
Mazıdağı region is very rich in phosphate mines.

== Composition ==
There are 53 neighbourhoods in Mazıdağı District:

- Aksu (Avgewr)
- Arıköy (Xana Zembûr)
- Arısu (Gola Gule)
- Aşağıocak (Kura Hamam)
- Atalar (Xarok)
- Atlıca (Ziyareta hesp)
- Aykut (Dêrgûz)
- Bahçecik (Basek)
- Balpınar (Giresor)
- Bilge (Zanqirt)
- Çankaya (Qêmêzê)
- Çayönü (Lalan)
- Derecik (Tawisî)
- Dikyamaç (Silotê)
- Duraklı (Helêla)
- Ekinciler (Kufrek)
- Enginköy (Ziznê)
- Erdalı (Xerabê Kurê)
- Evciler (Qesrik)
- Gümüşpınar (Tarîn)
- Gümüşyuva (Dêra Metîna)
- Gündoğan
- Gürgöze (Eynsilêman)
- İkisu (Mendêla)
- Işıkyaka (Bikrê)
- Karaalanı (Mêqere)
- Karataş (Şemika)
- Karşıyaka
- Kayalar
- Kebapçı (Kebabçî)
- Kemerli (Xerebazin)
- Kışlak (Şivistan)
- Kocakent (Tezne)
- Konur (Şeba jor)
- Meşeli (Melebiyê)
- Ömürlü (Pîran)
- Ortaklı (Xirbê Helêla)
- Poyraz
- Sağmal (Bîrînî)
- Sakızlı (Banxir)
- Şanlı (Dêşan)
- Şenyuva (Şewaşî)
- Tanrıyolu (Kurik)
- Tarlacık (Hetvan)
- Ulutaş (Hesena)
- Ürünlü (Qolçiya)
- Yağmur (Awrixan)
- Yalınağaç (Melebik)
- Yeşilköy (Xudurî)
- Yetkinler (Dirînê)
- Yücebağ (Reşan)
- Yukarıkonak (Xanika jor)
- Yukarıocak (Kura Helal)
