= Şurakənd, Khizi =

Şurakənd
- Location within Azerbaijan
- Coordinates: 40°51′40″N 49°06′08″E
- Country: Azerbaijan
- Rayon: Khizi
- Time zone: UTC+4 (AZT)
  - Summer (DST): UTC+5 (AZT)

Şurakənd (as Shurakend) is a village in the Khizi Rayon of Azerbaijan.
