= Güneşlı, Siazan =

Güneşlı
- Location within Azerbaijan
- Coordinates: 40°56′38″N 48°56′40″E
- Country: Azerbaijan
- Rayon: Siazan
- Time zone: UTC+4 (AZT)
  - Summer (DST): UTC+5 (AZT)

Güneşlı (also, Kunshady) is a village in the Siazan Rayon of Azerbaijan.
