= Günəşli, Shamkir =

Coordinates: 40°40′08″N 045°55′10″E

Günəşli (sometimes Martuni) is a village and municipality in the Shamkir District of Azerbaijan. Günəşli is in the Saler administrative subdivision of Shamkir District. It is located in the foothills of the Lesser Caucasus Mountains. It has a population of 471.

== History ==
Günəşli was founded in the mid-1800s by Russian settlers belonging to the "New Trinity" movement, i.e. Doukhobors. The area was originally named "Günəşli" (Gunashli), meaning "sun", by the local Azeris; but the settlers called their village "Novotroitskoye" ("New Trinity"). The Doukhobors left in 1899, emigrating to Canada, and local Azeri moved in and changed its name to Golitsino (Qolitsıno) in honor of Prince Grigory Golitsyn, who was the head administrator in the Caucasus at the time. In 1918 the village was depopulated when the villagers fled into the mountains for safety during the Armenian-Azerbaijani war (1918 - 1920).

After the war, Armenian families from around Noyemberyan moved into the village. They came to work in the copper mines of Gadabay District. In 1929, a collective farm named after Martuni was established in Golitsino, and subsequently the village was renamed "Martuni" (Alexander Miasnikian's pseudonym). In 1990, the settlement was again renamed, back to the original Azeri "Günəşli".
