= Günəşli, Gadabay =

Günəşli
- Location within Azerbaijan
- Coordinates: 40°31′24″N 45°48′39″E
- Country: Azerbaijan
- Rayon: Gadabay
- Municipality: Dəyəqarabulaq
- Time zone: UTC+4 (AZT)
  - Summer (DST): UTC+5 (AZT)

Günəşli (until 2004, Şurakənd and Shurakend) is a village in the Gadabay Rayon of Azerbaijan. The village forms part of the municipality of Dəyəqarabulaq.
