= Güneli, Nusaybin =

Village in Mardin Province, Turkey

Güneli
- Neighbourhood
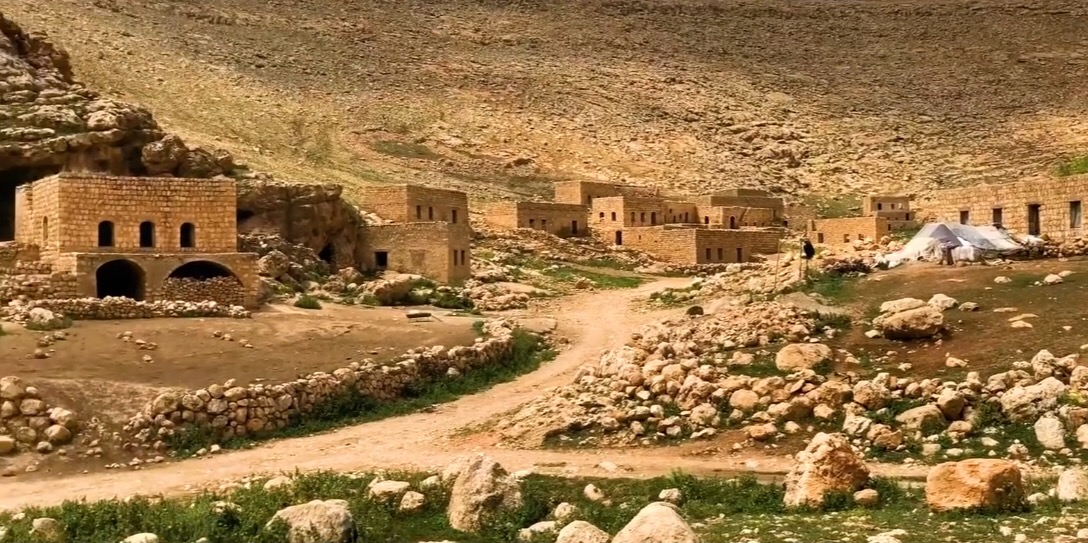

- Location within Turkey
- Coordinates: 37°08′52″N 41°31′26″E
- Country: Turkey
- Province: Mardin
- District: Nusaybin
- Population (2021): 22
- Time zone: UTC+3 (TRT)

Güneli (Kurdish: Geliyê Sora) is a neighbourhood in the municipality and district of Nusaybin, the Mardin Province of Turkey. The village is populated by Kurds of the Dasikan tribe and had a population of 22 in 2021. The village is Yazidi.

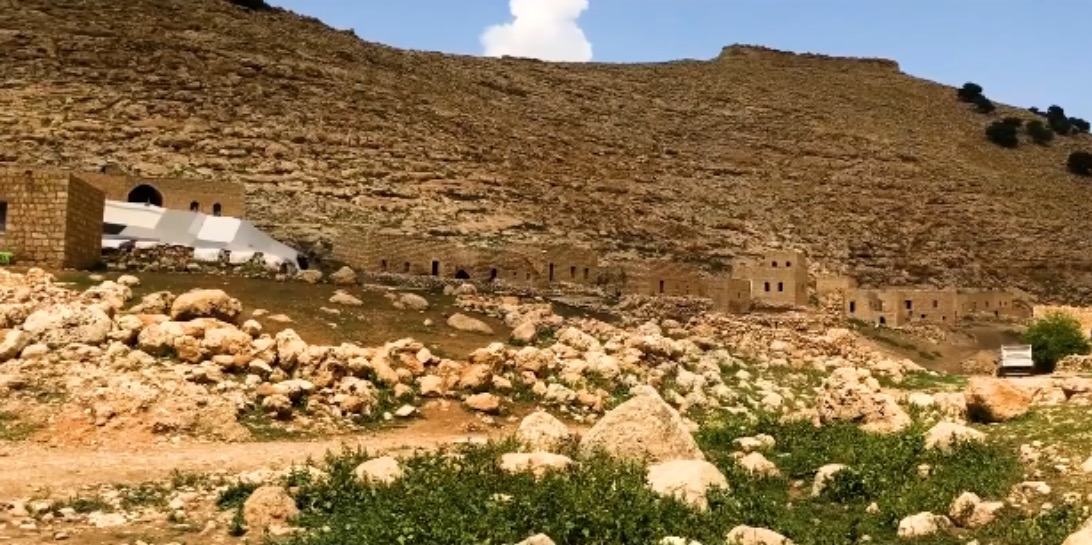
View of Güneli (2018)
