= Meseli, Republic of Bashkortostan =

Meseli Месели
- Selo
- Location within Bashkortostan Location within Russia
- Coordinates: 53°50′N 55°49′E
- Country: Russia
- Region: Bashkortostan
- District: Aurgazinsky District
- Time zone: UTC+5:00

Meseli (Russian: Месели; Bashkir: Мәҫәле, Mäśäle; Chuvash: Меселпуҫ, Meselpuś) is a rural locality (a selo) and the administrative centre of Meselinsky Selsoviet, Aurgazinsky District, Bashkortostan, Russia. The population was 592 as of 2010. There are 8 streets.

== Geography ==
Meseli is located 29 km south of Tolbazy (the district's administrative centre) by road. Maneyevo is the nearest rural locality.
