= Şahdağ =

Shahdagh
- Municipality
- Azerbaijani: Şahdağ
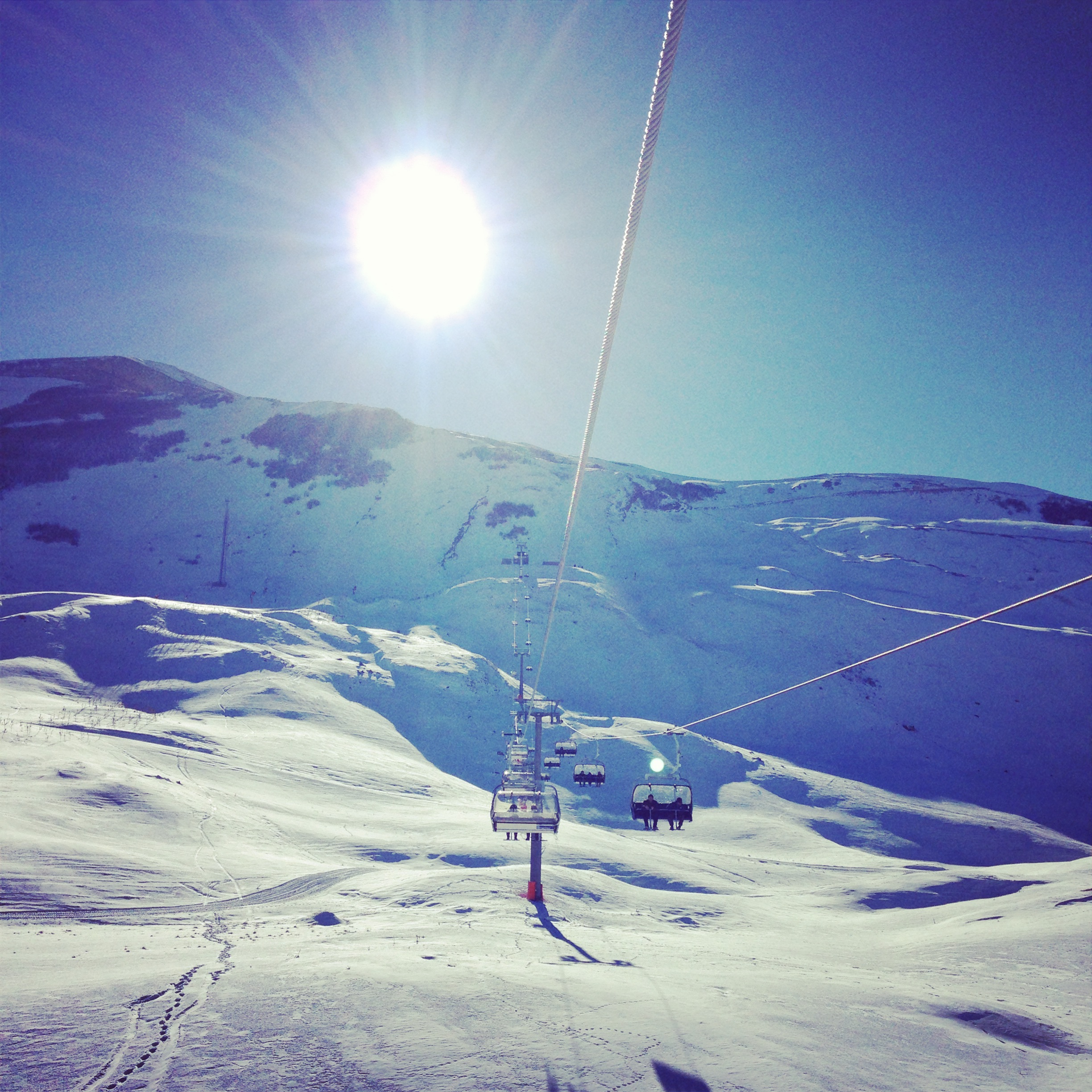

- Location within Azerbaijan
- Coordinates: 40°32′47″N 45°35′03″E
- Country: Azerbaijan
- District: Gadabay

Population
  - Total: 2,200
- Time zone: UTC+4 (AZT)
  - Summer (DST): UTC+5 (AZT)

Şahdağ (until 2004, Shahdagh and Shurakend) is a village and municipality in the Gadabay District of Azerbaijan. It has a population of 2,200. The municipality consists of the villages of Shahdagh and Arabachy.
